

185001–185100 

|-bgcolor=#d6d6d6
| 185001 ||  || — || August 12, 2006 || Palomar || NEAT || K-2 || align=right | 2.1 km || 
|-id=002 bgcolor=#fefefe
| 185002 ||  || — || August 12, 2006 || Palomar || NEAT || V || align=right data-sort-value="0.89" | 890 m || 
|-id=003 bgcolor=#fefefe
| 185003 ||  || — || August 13, 2006 || Palomar || NEAT || FLO || align=right data-sort-value="0.83" | 830 m || 
|-id=004 bgcolor=#fefefe
| 185004 ||  || — || August 13, 2006 || Palomar || NEAT || — || align=right data-sort-value="0.91" | 910 m || 
|-id=005 bgcolor=#d6d6d6
| 185005 ||  || — || August 13, 2006 || Palomar || NEAT || BRA || align=right | 2.6 km || 
|-id=006 bgcolor=#d6d6d6
| 185006 ||  || — || August 13, 2006 || Palomar || NEAT || — || align=right | 3.7 km || 
|-id=007 bgcolor=#fefefe
| 185007 ||  || — || August 15, 2006 || Palomar || NEAT || FLO || align=right data-sort-value="0.89" | 890 m || 
|-id=008 bgcolor=#fefefe
| 185008 ||  || — || August 15, 2006 || Palomar || NEAT || FLO || align=right data-sort-value="0.92" | 920 m || 
|-id=009 bgcolor=#d6d6d6
| 185009 ||  || — || August 12, 2006 || Palomar || NEAT || EMA || align=right | 6.4 km || 
|-id=010 bgcolor=#fefefe
| 185010 ||  || — || August 14, 2006 || Siding Spring || SSS || V || align=right data-sort-value="0.86" | 860 m || 
|-id=011 bgcolor=#fefefe
| 185011 ||  || — || August 14, 2006 || Palomar || NEAT || MAS || align=right | 1.0 km || 
|-id=012 bgcolor=#fefefe
| 185012 ||  || — || August 17, 2006 || Palomar || NEAT || H || align=right data-sort-value="0.95" | 950 m || 
|-id=013 bgcolor=#fefefe
| 185013 ||  || — || August 19, 2006 || Kitt Peak || Spacewatch || NYS || align=right data-sort-value="0.87" | 870 m || 
|-id=014 bgcolor=#fefefe
| 185014 ||  || — || August 17, 2006 || Palomar || NEAT || — || align=right | 1.8 km || 
|-id=015 bgcolor=#fefefe
| 185015 ||  || — || August 19, 2006 || Anderson Mesa || LONEOS || — || align=right data-sort-value="0.91" | 910 m || 
|-id=016 bgcolor=#fefefe
| 185016 ||  || — || August 18, 2006 || Kitt Peak || Spacewatch || — || align=right data-sort-value="0.97" | 970 m || 
|-id=017 bgcolor=#fefefe
| 185017 ||  || — || August 20, 2006 || Palomar || NEAT || V || align=right data-sort-value="0.77" | 770 m || 
|-id=018 bgcolor=#fefefe
| 185018 ||  || — || August 21, 2006 || Kitt Peak || Spacewatch || FLO || align=right data-sort-value="0.96" | 960 m || 
|-id=019 bgcolor=#d6d6d6
| 185019 ||  || — || August 17, 2006 || Palomar || NEAT || KOR || align=right | 2.5 km || 
|-id=020 bgcolor=#E9E9E9
| 185020 Pratte ||  ||  || August 23, 2006 || Antares || R. Holmes || — || align=right | 3.0 km || 
|-id=021 bgcolor=#fefefe
| 185021 ||  || — || August 16, 2006 || Siding Spring || SSS || V || align=right | 1.2 km || 
|-id=022 bgcolor=#fefefe
| 185022 ||  || — || August 18, 2006 || Anderson Mesa || LONEOS || FLO || align=right data-sort-value="0.94" | 940 m || 
|-id=023 bgcolor=#fefefe
| 185023 ||  || — || August 24, 2006 || Socorro || LINEAR || — || align=right | 1.6 km || 
|-id=024 bgcolor=#d6d6d6
| 185024 ||  || — || August 19, 2006 || Palomar || NEAT || HYG || align=right | 3.0 km || 
|-id=025 bgcolor=#E9E9E9
| 185025 ||  || — || August 21, 2006 || Socorro || LINEAR || EUN || align=right | 2.7 km || 
|-id=026 bgcolor=#fefefe
| 185026 ||  || — || August 24, 2006 || Palomar || NEAT || — || align=right | 1.0 km || 
|-id=027 bgcolor=#d6d6d6
| 185027 ||  || — || August 27, 2006 || Kitt Peak || Spacewatch || KOR || align=right | 1.9 km || 
|-id=028 bgcolor=#fefefe
| 185028 ||  || — || August 21, 2006 || Kitt Peak || Spacewatch || — || align=right data-sort-value="0.98" | 980 m || 
|-id=029 bgcolor=#fefefe
| 185029 ||  || — || August 22, 2006 || Palomar || NEAT || NYS || align=right data-sort-value="0.80" | 800 m || 
|-id=030 bgcolor=#fefefe
| 185030 ||  || — || August 27, 2006 || Kitt Peak || Spacewatch || NYS || align=right data-sort-value="0.86" | 860 m || 
|-id=031 bgcolor=#fefefe
| 185031 ||  || — || August 27, 2006 || Kitt Peak || Spacewatch || V || align=right data-sort-value="0.73" | 730 m || 
|-id=032 bgcolor=#d6d6d6
| 185032 ||  || — || August 16, 2006 || Palomar || NEAT || CHA || align=right | 2.9 km || 
|-id=033 bgcolor=#fefefe
| 185033 ||  || — || August 27, 2006 || Anderson Mesa || LONEOS || — || align=right | 1.3 km || 
|-id=034 bgcolor=#fefefe
| 185034 ||  || — || August 27, 2006 || Anderson Mesa || LONEOS || V || align=right | 1.1 km || 
|-id=035 bgcolor=#fefefe
| 185035 ||  || — || August 28, 2006 || Catalina || CSS || FLO || align=right | 1.2 km || 
|-id=036 bgcolor=#E9E9E9
| 185036 ||  || — || August 28, 2006 || Catalina || CSS || MIT || align=right | 3.1 km || 
|-id=037 bgcolor=#E9E9E9
| 185037 ||  || — || August 29, 2006 || Catalina || CSS || — || align=right | 2.5 km || 
|-id=038 bgcolor=#E9E9E9
| 185038 ||  || — || August 29, 2006 || Anderson Mesa || LONEOS || — || align=right | 3.7 km || 
|-id=039 bgcolor=#E9E9E9
| 185039 Alessiapossenti ||  ||  || August 30, 2006 || Vallemare di Borbona || V. S. Casulli || — || align=right | 1.5 km || 
|-id=040 bgcolor=#fefefe
| 185040 ||  || — || August 29, 2006 || Anderson Mesa || LONEOS || H || align=right | 1.0 km || 
|-id=041 bgcolor=#E9E9E9
| 185041 ||  || — || August 21, 2006 || Socorro || LINEAR || — || align=right | 2.2 km || 
|-id=042 bgcolor=#E9E9E9
| 185042 ||  || — || August 18, 2006 || Kitt Peak || Spacewatch || — || align=right | 1.2 km || 
|-id=043 bgcolor=#d6d6d6
| 185043 ||  || — || August 19, 2006 || Kitt Peak || Spacewatch || KOR || align=right | 2.1 km || 
|-id=044 bgcolor=#fefefe
| 185044 ||  || — || August 19, 2006 || Kitt Peak || Spacewatch || — || align=right | 1.1 km || 
|-id=045 bgcolor=#fefefe
| 185045 ||  || — || August 30, 2006 || Anderson Mesa || LONEOS || — || align=right data-sort-value="0.97" | 970 m || 
|-id=046 bgcolor=#fefefe
| 185046 ||  || — || September 12, 2006 || Catalina || CSS || — || align=right data-sort-value="0.88" | 880 m || 
|-id=047 bgcolor=#fefefe
| 185047 ||  || — || September 12, 2006 || Catalina || CSS || NYS || align=right data-sort-value="0.99" | 990 m || 
|-id=048 bgcolor=#fefefe
| 185048 ||  || — || September 12, 2006 || Catalina || CSS || H || align=right | 1.2 km || 
|-id=049 bgcolor=#fefefe
| 185049 ||  || — || September 12, 2006 || Catalina || CSS || — || align=right data-sort-value="0.96" | 960 m || 
|-id=050 bgcolor=#fefefe
| 185050 ||  || — || September 14, 2006 || Catalina || CSS || NYS || align=right | 1.0 km || 
|-id=051 bgcolor=#fefefe
| 185051 ||  || — || September 12, 2006 || Catalina || CSS || NYS || align=right data-sort-value="0.74" | 740 m || 
|-id=052 bgcolor=#E9E9E9
| 185052 ||  || — || September 12, 2006 || Catalina || CSS || — || align=right | 3.1 km || 
|-id=053 bgcolor=#d6d6d6
| 185053 ||  || — || September 14, 2006 || Palomar || NEAT || ALA || align=right | 5.4 km || 
|-id=054 bgcolor=#fefefe
| 185054 ||  || — || September 14, 2006 || Kitt Peak || Spacewatch || MAS || align=right data-sort-value="0.99" | 990 m || 
|-id=055 bgcolor=#E9E9E9
| 185055 ||  || — || September 14, 2006 || Catalina || CSS || — || align=right | 4.1 km || 
|-id=056 bgcolor=#E9E9E9
| 185056 ||  || — || September 15, 2006 || Catalina || CSS || — || align=right | 1.7 km || 
|-id=057 bgcolor=#E9E9E9
| 185057 ||  || — || September 15, 2006 || Palomar || NEAT || MIT || align=right | 3.3 km || 
|-id=058 bgcolor=#fefefe
| 185058 ||  || — || September 12, 2006 || Catalina || CSS || V || align=right | 1.0 km || 
|-id=059 bgcolor=#d6d6d6
| 185059 ||  || — || September 14, 2006 || Kitt Peak || Spacewatch || URS || align=right | 5.1 km || 
|-id=060 bgcolor=#E9E9E9
| 185060 ||  || — || September 14, 2006 || Palomar || NEAT || — || align=right | 3.8 km || 
|-id=061 bgcolor=#E9E9E9
| 185061 ||  || — || September 14, 2006 || Kitt Peak || Spacewatch || — || align=right | 3.3 km || 
|-id=062 bgcolor=#fefefe
| 185062 ||  || — || September 15, 2006 || Kitt Peak || Spacewatch || KLI || align=right | 3.0 km || 
|-id=063 bgcolor=#E9E9E9
| 185063 ||  || — || September 15, 2006 || Kitt Peak || Spacewatch || XIZ || align=right | 1.8 km || 
|-id=064 bgcolor=#E9E9E9
| 185064 ||  || — || September 15, 2006 || Kitt Peak || Spacewatch || — || align=right | 2.2 km || 
|-id=065 bgcolor=#E9E9E9
| 185065 ||  || — || September 12, 2006 || Catalina || CSS || — || align=right | 1.9 km || 
|-id=066 bgcolor=#fefefe
| 185066 ||  || — || September 14, 2006 || Kitt Peak || Spacewatch || — || align=right data-sort-value="0.75" | 750 m || 
|-id=067 bgcolor=#d6d6d6
| 185067 ||  || — || September 14, 2006 || Kitt Peak || Spacewatch || THM || align=right | 2.9 km || 
|-id=068 bgcolor=#fefefe
| 185068 ||  || — || September 14, 2006 || Kitt Peak || Spacewatch || MAS || align=right data-sort-value="0.93" | 930 m || 
|-id=069 bgcolor=#fefefe
| 185069 ||  || — || September 14, 2006 || Kitt Peak || Spacewatch || FLO || align=right data-sort-value="0.73" | 730 m || 
|-id=070 bgcolor=#d6d6d6
| 185070 ||  || — || September 14, 2006 || Kitt Peak || Spacewatch || KOR || align=right | 1.6 km || 
|-id=071 bgcolor=#fefefe
| 185071 ||  || — || September 14, 2006 || Kitt Peak || Spacewatch || V || align=right data-sort-value="0.89" | 890 m || 
|-id=072 bgcolor=#fefefe
| 185072 ||  || — || September 15, 2006 || Kitt Peak || Spacewatch || — || align=right | 1.2 km || 
|-id=073 bgcolor=#fefefe
| 185073 ||  || — || September 15, 2006 || Kitt Peak || Spacewatch || MAS || align=right data-sort-value="0.70" | 700 m || 
|-id=074 bgcolor=#fefefe
| 185074 ||  || — || September 15, 2006 || Kitt Peak || Spacewatch || MAS || align=right | 1.1 km || 
|-id=075 bgcolor=#fefefe
| 185075 ||  || — || September 12, 2006 || Catalina || CSS || V || align=right | 1.1 km || 
|-id=076 bgcolor=#fefefe
| 185076 ||  || — || September 15, 2006 || Kitt Peak || Spacewatch || MAS || align=right data-sort-value="0.92" | 920 m || 
|-id=077 bgcolor=#fefefe
| 185077 ||  || — || September 15, 2006 || Kitt Peak || Spacewatch || — || align=right | 1.1 km || 
|-id=078 bgcolor=#E9E9E9
| 185078 ||  || — || September 15, 2006 || Kitt Peak || Spacewatch || AST || align=right | 2.1 km || 
|-id=079 bgcolor=#E9E9E9
| 185079 ||  || — || September 15, 2006 || Kitt Peak || Spacewatch || — || align=right | 1.2 km || 
|-id=080 bgcolor=#d6d6d6
| 185080 ||  || — || September 15, 2006 || Kitt Peak || Spacewatch || — || align=right | 2.9 km || 
|-id=081 bgcolor=#fefefe
| 185081 ||  || — || September 15, 2006 || Kitt Peak || Spacewatch || — || align=right | 1.1 km || 
|-id=082 bgcolor=#E9E9E9
| 185082 ||  || — || September 15, 2006 || Kitt Peak || Spacewatch || — || align=right | 1.4 km || 
|-id=083 bgcolor=#E9E9E9
| 185083 ||  || — || September 15, 2006 || Kitt Peak || Spacewatch || — || align=right | 3.5 km || 
|-id=084 bgcolor=#fefefe
| 185084 ||  || — || September 15, 2006 || Kitt Peak || Spacewatch || — || align=right data-sort-value="0.95" | 950 m || 
|-id=085 bgcolor=#d6d6d6
| 185085 ||  || — || September 15, 2006 || Kitt Peak || Spacewatch || slow? || align=right | 2.9 km || 
|-id=086 bgcolor=#d6d6d6
| 185086 ||  || — || September 15, 2006 || Kitt Peak || Spacewatch || — || align=right | 3.4 km || 
|-id=087 bgcolor=#fefefe
| 185087 ||  || — || September 15, 2006 || Kitt Peak || Spacewatch || — || align=right | 1.0 km || 
|-id=088 bgcolor=#fefefe
| 185088 ||  || — || September 15, 2006 || Kitt Peak || Spacewatch || FLO || align=right data-sort-value="0.80" | 800 m || 
|-id=089 bgcolor=#d6d6d6
| 185089 ||  || — || September 15, 2006 || Kitt Peak || Spacewatch || 7:4 || align=right | 5.0 km || 
|-id=090 bgcolor=#fefefe
| 185090 ||  || — || September 15, 2006 || Kitt Peak || Spacewatch || — || align=right data-sort-value="0.83" | 830 m || 
|-id=091 bgcolor=#fefefe
| 185091 ||  || — || September 15, 2006 || Kitt Peak || Spacewatch || — || align=right | 1.2 km || 
|-id=092 bgcolor=#fefefe
| 185092 ||  || — || September 12, 2006 || Catalina || CSS || NYS || align=right data-sort-value="0.76" | 760 m || 
|-id=093 bgcolor=#fefefe
| 185093 ||  || — || September 14, 2006 || Kitt Peak || Spacewatch || V || align=right data-sort-value="0.69" | 690 m || 
|-id=094 bgcolor=#E9E9E9
| 185094 ||  || — || September 14, 2006 || Kitt Peak || Spacewatch || PAD || align=right | 2.6 km || 
|-id=095 bgcolor=#fefefe
| 185095 ||  || — || September 16, 2006 || Palomar || NEAT || — || align=right | 1.3 km || 
|-id=096 bgcolor=#d6d6d6
| 185096 ||  || — || September 16, 2006 || Palomar || NEAT || — || align=right | 3.6 km || 
|-id=097 bgcolor=#E9E9E9
| 185097 ||  || — || September 16, 2006 || Catalina || CSS || MIT || align=right | 3.3 km || 
|-id=098 bgcolor=#fefefe
| 185098 ||  || — || September 17, 2006 || Socorro || LINEAR || — || align=right | 1.1 km || 
|-id=099 bgcolor=#E9E9E9
| 185099 ||  || — || September 17, 2006 || Socorro || LINEAR || ADE || align=right | 3.0 km || 
|-id=100 bgcolor=#fefefe
| 185100 ||  || — || September 17, 2006 || Kitt Peak || Spacewatch || — || align=right | 1.2 km || 
|}

185101–185200 

|-bgcolor=#E9E9E9
| 185101 Balearicuni ||  ||  || September 19, 2006 || OAM || OAM Obs. || — || align=right | 2.4 km || 
|-id=102 bgcolor=#d6d6d6
| 185102 ||  || — || September 16, 2006 || Catalina || CSS || — || align=right | 3.6 km || 
|-id=103 bgcolor=#fefefe
| 185103 ||  || — || September 16, 2006 || Anderson Mesa || LONEOS || — || align=right data-sort-value="0.90" | 900 m || 
|-id=104 bgcolor=#fefefe
| 185104 ||  || — || September 16, 2006 || Anderson Mesa || LONEOS || — || align=right data-sort-value="0.91" | 910 m || 
|-id=105 bgcolor=#E9E9E9
| 185105 ||  || — || September 18, 2006 || Catalina || CSS || — || align=right | 4.1 km || 
|-id=106 bgcolor=#fefefe
| 185106 ||  || — || September 16, 2006 || Anderson Mesa || LONEOS || — || align=right | 1.1 km || 
|-id=107 bgcolor=#fefefe
| 185107 ||  || — || September 17, 2006 || Catalina || CSS || — || align=right | 1.3 km || 
|-id=108 bgcolor=#fefefe
| 185108 ||  || — || September 17, 2006 || Kitt Peak || Spacewatch || NYS || align=right data-sort-value="0.75" | 750 m || 
|-id=109 bgcolor=#E9E9E9
| 185109 ||  || — || September 18, 2006 || Catalina || CSS || — || align=right | 1.2 km || 
|-id=110 bgcolor=#E9E9E9
| 185110 ||  || — || September 19, 2006 || Catalina || CSS || — || align=right | 1.7 km || 
|-id=111 bgcolor=#fefefe
| 185111 ||  || — || September 19, 2006 || Kitt Peak || Spacewatch || — || align=right | 1.1 km || 
|-id=112 bgcolor=#fefefe
| 185112 ||  || — || September 19, 2006 || Kitt Peak || Spacewatch || — || align=right | 1.5 km || 
|-id=113 bgcolor=#fefefe
| 185113 ||  || — || September 16, 2006 || Catalina || CSS || — || align=right | 1.4 km || 
|-id=114 bgcolor=#E9E9E9
| 185114 ||  || — || September 18, 2006 || Kitt Peak || Spacewatch || NEM || align=right | 2.5 km || 
|-id=115 bgcolor=#E9E9E9
| 185115 ||  || — || September 17, 2006 || Anderson Mesa || LONEOS || — || align=right | 4.0 km || 
|-id=116 bgcolor=#E9E9E9
| 185116 ||  || — || September 18, 2006 || Catalina || CSS || GEF || align=right | 2.2 km || 
|-id=117 bgcolor=#fefefe
| 185117 ||  || — || September 18, 2006 || Catalina || CSS || — || align=right | 1.1 km || 
|-id=118 bgcolor=#fefefe
| 185118 ||  || — || September 18, 2006 || Catalina || CSS || — || align=right | 1.2 km || 
|-id=119 bgcolor=#fefefe
| 185119 ||  || — || September 17, 2006 || Kitt Peak || Spacewatch || FLO || align=right data-sort-value="0.63" | 630 m || 
|-id=120 bgcolor=#d6d6d6
| 185120 ||  || — || September 18, 2006 || Anderson Mesa || LONEOS || — || align=right | 4.8 km || 
|-id=121 bgcolor=#E9E9E9
| 185121 ||  || — || September 20, 2006 || Palomar || NEAT || WIT || align=right | 1.7 km || 
|-id=122 bgcolor=#fefefe
| 185122 ||  || — || September 19, 2006 || Kitt Peak || Spacewatch || — || align=right | 1.0 km || 
|-id=123 bgcolor=#fefefe
| 185123 ||  || — || September 19, 2006 || Kitt Peak || Spacewatch || — || align=right data-sort-value="0.94" | 940 m || 
|-id=124 bgcolor=#fefefe
| 185124 ||  || — || September 19, 2006 || Kitt Peak || Spacewatch || V || align=right data-sort-value="0.93" | 930 m || 
|-id=125 bgcolor=#fefefe
| 185125 ||  || — || September 19, 2006 || Kitt Peak || Spacewatch || — || align=right data-sort-value="0.85" | 850 m || 
|-id=126 bgcolor=#fefefe
| 185126 ||  || — || September 19, 2006 || Kitt Peak || Spacewatch || V || align=right data-sort-value="0.86" | 860 m || 
|-id=127 bgcolor=#fefefe
| 185127 ||  || — || September 18, 2006 || Kitt Peak || Spacewatch || NYS || align=right data-sort-value="0.87" | 870 m || 
|-id=128 bgcolor=#d6d6d6
| 185128 ||  || — || September 18, 2006 || Kitt Peak || Spacewatch || — || align=right | 2.9 km || 
|-id=129 bgcolor=#E9E9E9
| 185129 ||  || — || September 18, 2006 || Kitt Peak || Spacewatch || — || align=right | 1.8 km || 
|-id=130 bgcolor=#E9E9E9
| 185130 ||  || — || September 18, 2006 || Kitt Peak || Spacewatch || — || align=right | 1.3 km || 
|-id=131 bgcolor=#d6d6d6
| 185131 ||  || — || September 19, 2006 || Catalina || CSS || THM || align=right | 4.3 km || 
|-id=132 bgcolor=#d6d6d6
| 185132 ||  || — || September 19, 2006 || Kitt Peak || Spacewatch || — || align=right | 2.6 km || 
|-id=133 bgcolor=#fefefe
| 185133 ||  || — || September 21, 2006 || Goodricke-Pigott || R. A. Tucker || FLO || align=right data-sort-value="0.81" | 810 m || 
|-id=134 bgcolor=#fefefe
| 185134 ||  || — || September 22, 2006 || Anderson Mesa || LONEOS || — || align=right | 3.7 km || 
|-id=135 bgcolor=#d6d6d6
| 185135 ||  || — || September 18, 2006 || Catalina || CSS || — || align=right | 4.2 km || 
|-id=136 bgcolor=#fefefe
| 185136 ||  || — || September 18, 2006 || Catalina || CSS || — || align=right | 1.4 km || 
|-id=137 bgcolor=#d6d6d6
| 185137 ||  || — || September 18, 2006 || Catalina || CSS || — || align=right | 4.5 km || 
|-id=138 bgcolor=#E9E9E9
| 185138 ||  || — || September 19, 2006 || Catalina || CSS || — || align=right | 2.7 km || 
|-id=139 bgcolor=#E9E9E9
| 185139 ||  || — || September 25, 2006 || Kitt Peak || Spacewatch || — || align=right | 2.2 km || 
|-id=140 bgcolor=#d6d6d6
| 185140 ||  || — || September 17, 2006 || Anderson Mesa || LONEOS || 7:4 || align=right | 5.0 km || 
|-id=141 bgcolor=#fefefe
| 185141 ||  || — || September 18, 2006 || Calvin-Rehoboth || Calvin–Rehoboth Obs. || — || align=right data-sort-value="0.93" | 930 m || 
|-id=142 bgcolor=#E9E9E9
| 185142 ||  || — || September 16, 2006 || Catalina || CSS || — || align=right | 3.4 km || 
|-id=143 bgcolor=#E9E9E9
| 185143 ||  || — || September 20, 2006 || Anderson Mesa || LONEOS || GEF || align=right | 1.8 km || 
|-id=144 bgcolor=#E9E9E9
| 185144 ||  || — || September 19, 2006 || Kitt Peak || Spacewatch || — || align=right | 2.0 km || 
|-id=145 bgcolor=#fefefe
| 185145 ||  || — || September 22, 2006 || Socorro || LINEAR || NYS || align=right | 1.1 km || 
|-id=146 bgcolor=#E9E9E9
| 185146 ||  || — || September 23, 2006 || Kitt Peak || Spacewatch || — || align=right | 1.0 km || 
|-id=147 bgcolor=#fefefe
| 185147 ||  || — || September 23, 2006 || Kitt Peak || Spacewatch || — || align=right | 1.1 km || 
|-id=148 bgcolor=#fefefe
| 185148 ||  || — || September 23, 2006 || Kitt Peak || Spacewatch || V || align=right data-sort-value="0.99" | 990 m || 
|-id=149 bgcolor=#fefefe
| 185149 ||  || — || September 23, 2006 || Kitt Peak || Spacewatch || — || align=right data-sort-value="0.89" | 890 m || 
|-id=150 bgcolor=#E9E9E9
| 185150 Panevezys ||  ||  || September 23, 2006 || Moletai || K. Černis || — || align=right data-sort-value="0.98" | 980 m || 
|-id=151 bgcolor=#d6d6d6
| 185151 ||  || — || September 26, 2006 || Kitt Peak || Spacewatch || — || align=right | 3.6 km || 
|-id=152 bgcolor=#E9E9E9
| 185152 ||  || — || September 26, 2006 || Mount Lemmon || Mount Lemmon Survey || — || align=right | 1.2 km || 
|-id=153 bgcolor=#fefefe
| 185153 ||  || — || September 26, 2006 || Mount Lemmon || Mount Lemmon Survey || FLO || align=right data-sort-value="0.57" | 570 m || 
|-id=154 bgcolor=#fefefe
| 185154 ||  || — || September 26, 2006 || Kitt Peak || Spacewatch || NYS || align=right | 1.2 km || 
|-id=155 bgcolor=#fefefe
| 185155 ||  || — || September 27, 2006 || Goodricke-Pigott || R. A. Tucker || — || align=right data-sort-value="0.84" | 840 m || 
|-id=156 bgcolor=#d6d6d6
| 185156 ||  || — || September 24, 2006 || Kitt Peak || Spacewatch || KOR || align=right | 1.9 km || 
|-id=157 bgcolor=#fefefe
| 185157 ||  || — || September 25, 2006 || Kitt Peak || Spacewatch || V || align=right data-sort-value="0.73" | 730 m || 
|-id=158 bgcolor=#d6d6d6
| 185158 ||  || — || September 25, 2006 || Kitt Peak || Spacewatch || — || align=right | 3.6 km || 
|-id=159 bgcolor=#E9E9E9
| 185159 ||  || — || September 26, 2006 || Mount Lemmon || Mount Lemmon Survey || MRX || align=right | 1.3 km || 
|-id=160 bgcolor=#fefefe
| 185160 ||  || — || September 26, 2006 || Kitt Peak || Spacewatch || FLO || align=right | 1.0 km || 
|-id=161 bgcolor=#E9E9E9
| 185161 ||  || — || September 27, 2006 || Kitt Peak || Spacewatch || — || align=right | 1.3 km || 
|-id=162 bgcolor=#E9E9E9
| 185162 ||  || — || September 27, 2006 || Kitt Peak || Spacewatch || GER || align=right | 1.7 km || 
|-id=163 bgcolor=#fefefe
| 185163 ||  || — || September 27, 2006 || Kitt Peak || Spacewatch || — || align=right data-sort-value="0.98" | 980 m || 
|-id=164 bgcolor=#E9E9E9
| 185164 Ingeburgherz ||  ||  || September 27, 2006 || OAM || OAM Obs. || MRX || align=right | 1.3 km || 
|-id=165 bgcolor=#fefefe
| 185165 ||  || — || September 23, 2006 || Kitt Peak || Spacewatch || V || align=right data-sort-value="0.93" | 930 m || 
|-id=166 bgcolor=#fefefe
| 185166 ||  || — || September 25, 2006 || Mount Lemmon || Mount Lemmon Survey || — || align=right | 1.0 km || 
|-id=167 bgcolor=#fefefe
| 185167 ||  || — || September 26, 2006 || Mount Lemmon || Mount Lemmon Survey || NYS || align=right data-sort-value="0.86" | 860 m || 
|-id=168 bgcolor=#E9E9E9
| 185168 ||  || — || September 26, 2006 || Kitt Peak || Spacewatch || — || align=right | 1.8 km || 
|-id=169 bgcolor=#d6d6d6
| 185169 ||  || — || September 26, 2006 || Kitt Peak || Spacewatch || — || align=right | 3.9 km || 
|-id=170 bgcolor=#E9E9E9
| 185170 ||  || — || September 28, 2006 || Catalina || CSS || — || align=right | 2.1 km || 
|-id=171 bgcolor=#E9E9E9
| 185171 ||  || — || September 29, 2006 || Anderson Mesa || LONEOS || — || align=right | 3.0 km || 
|-id=172 bgcolor=#d6d6d6
| 185172 ||  || — || September 25, 2006 || Anderson Mesa || LONEOS || EOS || align=right | 2.6 km || 
|-id=173 bgcolor=#fefefe
| 185173 ||  || — || September 26, 2006 || Catalina || CSS || — || align=right data-sort-value="0.99" | 990 m || 
|-id=174 bgcolor=#E9E9E9
| 185174 ||  || — || September 27, 2006 || Anderson Mesa || LONEOS || WIT || align=right | 1.7 km || 
|-id=175 bgcolor=#E9E9E9
| 185175 ||  || — || September 29, 2006 || Anderson Mesa || LONEOS || — || align=right | 2.0 km || 
|-id=176 bgcolor=#d6d6d6
| 185176 ||  || — || September 21, 2006 || Catalina || CSS || — || align=right | 4.3 km || 
|-id=177 bgcolor=#E9E9E9
| 185177 ||  || — || September 27, 2006 || Kitt Peak || Spacewatch || HOF || align=right | 3.7 km || 
|-id=178 bgcolor=#E9E9E9
| 185178 ||  || — || September 27, 2006 || Kitt Peak || Spacewatch || — || align=right | 1.3 km || 
|-id=179 bgcolor=#d6d6d6
| 185179 ||  || — || September 28, 2006 || Mount Lemmon || Mount Lemmon Survey || — || align=right | 3.1 km || 
|-id=180 bgcolor=#fefefe
| 185180 ||  || — || September 28, 2006 || Mount Lemmon || Mount Lemmon Survey || V || align=right | 1.0 km || 
|-id=181 bgcolor=#d6d6d6
| 185181 ||  || — || September 28, 2006 || Kitt Peak || Spacewatch || — || align=right | 3.5 km || 
|-id=182 bgcolor=#E9E9E9
| 185182 ||  || — || September 28, 2006 || Kitt Peak || Spacewatch || — || align=right | 3.0 km || 
|-id=183 bgcolor=#E9E9E9
| 185183 ||  || — || September 28, 2006 || Kitt Peak || Spacewatch || — || align=right | 1.4 km || 
|-id=184 bgcolor=#fefefe
| 185184 ||  || — || September 30, 2006 || Catalina || CSS || — || align=right | 1.2 km || 
|-id=185 bgcolor=#fefefe
| 185185 ||  || — || September 30, 2006 || Catalina || CSS || V || align=right data-sort-value="0.93" | 930 m || 
|-id=186 bgcolor=#E9E9E9
| 185186 ||  || — || September 30, 2006 || Catalina || CSS || — || align=right | 2.8 km || 
|-id=187 bgcolor=#E9E9E9
| 185187 ||  || — || September 18, 2006 || Catalina || CSS || EUN || align=right | 1.9 km || 
|-id=188 bgcolor=#E9E9E9
| 185188 ||  || — || September 25, 2006 || Kitt Peak || Spacewatch || — || align=right | 1.6 km || 
|-id=189 bgcolor=#d6d6d6
| 185189 ||  || — || September 27, 2006 || Mount Lemmon || Mount Lemmon Survey || — || align=right | 4.0 km || 
|-id=190 bgcolor=#fefefe
| 185190 ||  || — || September 30, 2006 || Catalina || CSS || — || align=right | 1.1 km || 
|-id=191 bgcolor=#E9E9E9
| 185191 ||  || — || October 3, 2006 || Mount Lemmon || Mount Lemmon Survey || — || align=right | 2.0 km || 
|-id=192 bgcolor=#fefefe
| 185192 ||  || — || October 1, 2006 || Kitt Peak || Spacewatch || — || align=right | 1.1 km || 
|-id=193 bgcolor=#fefefe
| 185193 ||  || — || October 2, 2006 || Kitt Peak || Spacewatch || NYS || align=right data-sort-value="0.78" | 780 m || 
|-id=194 bgcolor=#d6d6d6
| 185194 ||  || — || October 2, 2006 || Mount Lemmon || Mount Lemmon Survey || — || align=right | 3.0 km || 
|-id=195 bgcolor=#fefefe
| 185195 ||  || — || October 2, 2006 || Mount Lemmon || Mount Lemmon Survey || FLO || align=right | 1.2 km || 
|-id=196 bgcolor=#E9E9E9
| 185196 Vámbéry||  || — || October 15, 2006 || Piszkéstető || K. Sárneczky, Z. Kuli || — || align=right | 1.4 km || 
|-id=197 bgcolor=#E9E9E9
| 185197 ||  || — || October 10, 2006 || Palomar || NEAT || — || align=right | 2.0 km || 
|-id=198 bgcolor=#E9E9E9
| 185198 ||  || — || October 11, 2006 || Kitt Peak || Spacewatch || — || align=right | 1.6 km || 
|-id=199 bgcolor=#d6d6d6
| 185199 ||  || — || October 12, 2006 || Kitt Peak || Spacewatch || — || align=right | 3.8 km || 
|-id=200 bgcolor=#d6d6d6
| 185200 ||  || — || October 12, 2006 || Kitt Peak || Spacewatch || KOR || align=right | 1.6 km || 
|}

185201–185300 

|-bgcolor=#d6d6d6
| 185201 ||  || — || October 12, 2006 || Kitt Peak || Spacewatch || — || align=right | 2.4 km || 
|-id=202 bgcolor=#E9E9E9
| 185202 ||  || — || October 12, 2006 || Kitt Peak || Spacewatch || RAF || align=right | 1.6 km || 
|-id=203 bgcolor=#E9E9E9
| 185203 ||  || — || October 12, 2006 || Kitt Peak || Spacewatch || — || align=right | 1.8 km || 
|-id=204 bgcolor=#d6d6d6
| 185204 ||  || — || October 12, 2006 || Kitt Peak || Spacewatch || TIR || align=right | 4.2 km || 
|-id=205 bgcolor=#fefefe
| 185205 ||  || — || October 12, 2006 || Kitt Peak || Spacewatch || — || align=right | 1.3 km || 
|-id=206 bgcolor=#fefefe
| 185206 ||  || — || October 12, 2006 || Kitt Peak || Spacewatch || — || align=right | 1.4 km || 
|-id=207 bgcolor=#E9E9E9
| 185207 ||  || — || October 12, 2006 || Kitt Peak || Spacewatch || — || align=right | 2.3 km || 
|-id=208 bgcolor=#fefefe
| 185208 ||  || — || October 12, 2006 || Kitt Peak || Spacewatch || — || align=right data-sort-value="0.98" | 980 m || 
|-id=209 bgcolor=#E9E9E9
| 185209 ||  || — || October 12, 2006 || Kitt Peak || Spacewatch || AST || align=right | 3.0 km || 
|-id=210 bgcolor=#E9E9E9
| 185210 ||  || — || October 12, 2006 || Kitt Peak || Spacewatch || — || align=right | 1.3 km || 
|-id=211 bgcolor=#E9E9E9
| 185211 ||  || — || October 12, 2006 || Kitt Peak || Spacewatch || HEN || align=right | 3.5 km || 
|-id=212 bgcolor=#fefefe
| 185212 ||  || — || October 12, 2006 || Kitt Peak || Spacewatch || NYS || align=right data-sort-value="0.97" | 970 m || 
|-id=213 bgcolor=#fefefe
| 185213 ||  || — || October 12, 2006 || Kitt Peak || Spacewatch || MAS || align=right | 1.0 km || 
|-id=214 bgcolor=#fefefe
| 185214 ||  || — || October 12, 2006 || Palomar || NEAT || — || align=right | 1.3 km || 
|-id=215 bgcolor=#E9E9E9
| 185215 ||  || — || October 12, 2006 || Palomar || NEAT || — || align=right | 1.2 km || 
|-id=216 bgcolor=#E9E9E9
| 185216 Gueiren ||  ||  || October 14, 2006 || Lulin Observatory || Q.-z. Ye, C.-S. Lin || — || align=right | 2.2 km || 
|-id=217 bgcolor=#fefefe
| 185217 ||  || — || October 15, 2006 || Catalina || CSS || SUL || align=right | 3.4 km || 
|-id=218 bgcolor=#d6d6d6
| 185218 ||  || — || October 13, 2006 || Kitt Peak || Spacewatch || HYG || align=right | 3.4 km || 
|-id=219 bgcolor=#E9E9E9
| 185219 ||  || — || October 12, 2006 || Kitt Peak || Spacewatch || HEN || align=right | 1.6 km || 
|-id=220 bgcolor=#E9E9E9
| 185220 ||  || — || October 9, 2006 || Palomar || NEAT || — || align=right | 3.1 km || 
|-id=221 bgcolor=#E9E9E9
| 185221 ||  || — || October 11, 2006 || Palomar || NEAT || AGN || align=right | 1.7 km || 
|-id=222 bgcolor=#E9E9E9
| 185222 ||  || — || October 11, 2006 || Palomar || NEAT || — || align=right | 4.0 km || 
|-id=223 bgcolor=#fefefe
| 185223 ||  || — || October 11, 2006 || Palomar || NEAT || — || align=right data-sort-value="0.96" | 960 m || 
|-id=224 bgcolor=#d6d6d6
| 185224 ||  || — || October 11, 2006 || Kitt Peak || Spacewatch || — || align=right | 4.6 km || 
|-id=225 bgcolor=#d6d6d6
| 185225 ||  || — || October 11, 2006 || Palomar || NEAT || — || align=right | 3.3 km || 
|-id=226 bgcolor=#fefefe
| 185226 ||  || — || October 11, 2006 || Palomar || NEAT || — || align=right | 1.3 km || 
|-id=227 bgcolor=#d6d6d6
| 185227 ||  || — || October 11, 2006 || Palomar || NEAT || — || align=right | 4.4 km || 
|-id=228 bgcolor=#fefefe
| 185228 ||  || — || October 12, 2006 || Kitt Peak || Spacewatch || — || align=right | 1.2 km || 
|-id=229 bgcolor=#d6d6d6
| 185229 ||  || — || October 12, 2006 || Palomar || NEAT || HYG || align=right | 4.2 km || 
|-id=230 bgcolor=#fefefe
| 185230 ||  || — || October 13, 2006 || Kitt Peak || Spacewatch || — || align=right | 1.1 km || 
|-id=231 bgcolor=#d6d6d6
| 185231 ||  || — || October 13, 2006 || Kitt Peak || Spacewatch || KOR || align=right | 1.6 km || 
|-id=232 bgcolor=#fefefe
| 185232 ||  || — || October 15, 2006 || Kitt Peak || Spacewatch || — || align=right | 1.00 km || 
|-id=233 bgcolor=#E9E9E9
| 185233 ||  || — || October 12, 2006 || Kitt Peak || Spacewatch || — || align=right | 1.6 km || 
|-id=234 bgcolor=#d6d6d6
| 185234 ||  || — || October 13, 2006 || Kitt Peak || Spacewatch || — || align=right | 3.4 km || 
|-id=235 bgcolor=#d6d6d6
| 185235 ||  || — || October 1, 2006 || Apache Point || A. C. Becker || — || align=right | 5.0 km || 
|-id=236 bgcolor=#d6d6d6
| 185236 ||  || — || October 12, 2006 || Apache Point || A. C. Becker || — || align=right | 4.2 km || 
|-id=237 bgcolor=#E9E9E9
| 185237 ||  || — || October 13, 2006 || Kitt Peak || Spacewatch || — || align=right | 2.7 km || 
|-id=238 bgcolor=#fefefe
| 185238 ||  || — || October 16, 2006 || Catalina || CSS || NYS || align=right data-sort-value="0.79" | 790 m || 
|-id=239 bgcolor=#E9E9E9
| 185239 ||  || — || October 16, 2006 || Catalina || CSS || — || align=right | 3.2 km || 
|-id=240 bgcolor=#E9E9E9
| 185240 ||  || — || October 17, 2006 || Mount Lemmon || Mount Lemmon Survey || — || align=right | 2.6 km || 
|-id=241 bgcolor=#d6d6d6
| 185241 ||  || — || October 17, 2006 || Mount Lemmon || Mount Lemmon Survey || — || align=right | 4.4 km || 
|-id=242 bgcolor=#d6d6d6
| 185242 ||  || — || October 16, 2006 || Kitt Peak || Spacewatch || — || align=right | 3.1 km || 
|-id=243 bgcolor=#fefefe
| 185243 ||  || — || October 16, 2006 || Kitt Peak || Spacewatch || V || align=right | 1.1 km || 
|-id=244 bgcolor=#d6d6d6
| 185244 ||  || — || October 16, 2006 || Kitt Peak || Spacewatch || — || align=right | 3.4 km || 
|-id=245 bgcolor=#fefefe
| 185245 ||  || — || October 16, 2006 || Kitt Peak || Spacewatch || — || align=right | 1.2 km || 
|-id=246 bgcolor=#E9E9E9
| 185246 ||  || — || October 17, 2006 || Catalina || CSS || — || align=right | 1.4 km || 
|-id=247 bgcolor=#fefefe
| 185247 ||  || — || October 18, 2006 || Kitt Peak || Spacewatch || NYS || align=right data-sort-value="0.70" | 700 m || 
|-id=248 bgcolor=#fefefe
| 185248 ||  || — || October 19, 2006 || Catalina || CSS || V || align=right data-sort-value="0.94" | 940 m || 
|-id=249 bgcolor=#E9E9E9
| 185249 ||  || — || October 17, 2006 || Mount Lemmon || Mount Lemmon Survey || — || align=right | 1.4 km || 
|-id=250 bgcolor=#d6d6d6
| 185250 Korostyshiv ||  ||  || October 17, 2006 || Andrushivka || Andrushivka Obs. || EOS || align=right | 3.1 km || 
|-id=251 bgcolor=#d6d6d6
| 185251 ||  || — || October 20, 2006 || Kitt Peak || Spacewatch || — || align=right | 2.3 km || 
|-id=252 bgcolor=#fefefe
| 185252 ||  || — || October 17, 2006 || Mount Lemmon || Mount Lemmon Survey || MAS || align=right | 1.0 km || 
|-id=253 bgcolor=#E9E9E9
| 185253 ||  || — || October 16, 2006 || Catalina || CSS || — || align=right | 4.2 km || 
|-id=254 bgcolor=#d6d6d6
| 185254 ||  || — || October 16, 2006 || Catalina || CSS || — || align=right | 3.5 km || 
|-id=255 bgcolor=#E9E9E9
| 185255 ||  || — || October 17, 2006 || Kitt Peak || Spacewatch || — || align=right | 2.4 km || 
|-id=256 bgcolor=#E9E9E9
| 185256 ||  || — || October 17, 2006 || Kitt Peak || Spacewatch || AGN || align=right | 1.5 km || 
|-id=257 bgcolor=#d6d6d6
| 185257 ||  || — || October 17, 2006 || Kitt Peak || Spacewatch || KOR || align=right | 2.0 km || 
|-id=258 bgcolor=#E9E9E9
| 185258 ||  || — || October 18, 2006 || Kitt Peak || Spacewatch || — || align=right | 1.0 km || 
|-id=259 bgcolor=#fefefe
| 185259 ||  || — || October 18, 2006 || Kitt Peak || Spacewatch || MAS || align=right data-sort-value="0.85" | 850 m || 
|-id=260 bgcolor=#fefefe
| 185260 ||  || — || October 18, 2006 || Kitt Peak || Spacewatch || FLO || align=right data-sort-value="0.91" | 910 m || 
|-id=261 bgcolor=#E9E9E9
| 185261 ||  || — || October 19, 2006 || Kitt Peak || Spacewatch || — || align=right | 1.1 km || 
|-id=262 bgcolor=#fefefe
| 185262 ||  || — || October 19, 2006 || Kitt Peak || Spacewatch || FLO || align=right data-sort-value="0.66" | 660 m || 
|-id=263 bgcolor=#E9E9E9
| 185263 ||  || — || October 19, 2006 || Kitt Peak || Spacewatch || — || align=right | 1.5 km || 
|-id=264 bgcolor=#d6d6d6
| 185264 ||  || — || October 19, 2006 || Kitt Peak || Spacewatch || — || align=right | 3.5 km || 
|-id=265 bgcolor=#fefefe
| 185265 ||  || — || October 19, 2006 || Palomar || NEAT || — || align=right | 1.0 km || 
|-id=266 bgcolor=#fefefe
| 185266 ||  || — || October 19, 2006 || Kitt Peak || Spacewatch || NYS || align=right data-sort-value="0.96" | 960 m || 
|-id=267 bgcolor=#d6d6d6
| 185267 ||  || — || October 19, 2006 || Kitt Peak || Spacewatch || — || align=right | 2.6 km || 
|-id=268 bgcolor=#fefefe
| 185268 ||  || — || October 19, 2006 || Kitt Peak || Spacewatch || — || align=right | 1.1 km || 
|-id=269 bgcolor=#fefefe
| 185269 ||  || — || October 19, 2006 || Kitt Peak || Spacewatch || — || align=right | 1.4 km || 
|-id=270 bgcolor=#E9E9E9
| 185270 ||  || — || October 19, 2006 || Kitt Peak || Spacewatch || — || align=right | 1.4 km || 
|-id=271 bgcolor=#fefefe
| 185271 ||  || — || October 21, 2006 || Kitt Peak || Spacewatch || — || align=right data-sort-value="0.95" | 950 m || 
|-id=272 bgcolor=#d6d6d6
| 185272 ||  || — || October 21, 2006 || Mount Lemmon || Mount Lemmon Survey || KOR || align=right | 1.4 km || 
|-id=273 bgcolor=#E9E9E9
| 185273 ||  || — || October 21, 2006 || Mount Lemmon || Mount Lemmon Survey || — || align=right | 2.0 km || 
|-id=274 bgcolor=#fefefe
| 185274 ||  || — || October 19, 2006 || Catalina || CSS || V || align=right data-sort-value="0.98" | 980 m || 
|-id=275 bgcolor=#E9E9E9
| 185275 ||  || — || October 16, 2006 || Catalina || CSS || — || align=right | 1.5 km || 
|-id=276 bgcolor=#E9E9E9
| 185276 ||  || — || October 16, 2006 || Catalina || CSS || — || align=right | 2.2 km || 
|-id=277 bgcolor=#E9E9E9
| 185277 ||  || — || October 16, 2006 || Catalina || CSS || — || align=right | 2.3 km || 
|-id=278 bgcolor=#d6d6d6
| 185278 ||  || — || October 16, 2006 || Catalina || CSS || — || align=right | 3.6 km || 
|-id=279 bgcolor=#d6d6d6
| 185279 ||  || — || October 19, 2006 || Catalina || CSS || — || align=right | 5.2 km || 
|-id=280 bgcolor=#E9E9E9
| 185280 ||  || — || October 19, 2006 || Catalina || CSS || GEF || align=right | 1.6 km || 
|-id=281 bgcolor=#E9E9E9
| 185281 ||  || — || October 20, 2006 || Kitt Peak || Spacewatch || — || align=right | 1.4 km || 
|-id=282 bgcolor=#d6d6d6
| 185282 ||  || — || October 20, 2006 || Kitt Peak || Spacewatch || — || align=right | 2.7 km || 
|-id=283 bgcolor=#fefefe
| 185283 ||  || — || October 20, 2006 || Kitt Peak || Spacewatch || NYS || align=right data-sort-value="0.96" | 960 m || 
|-id=284 bgcolor=#d6d6d6
| 185284 ||  || — || October 21, 2006 || Kitt Peak || Spacewatch || — || align=right | 2.4 km || 
|-id=285 bgcolor=#d6d6d6
| 185285 ||  || — || October 22, 2006 || Palomar || NEAT || — || align=right | 4.1 km || 
|-id=286 bgcolor=#fefefe
| 185286 ||  || — || October 22, 2006 || Palomar || NEAT || — || align=right | 1.3 km || 
|-id=287 bgcolor=#E9E9E9
| 185287 ||  || — || October 22, 2006 || Palomar || NEAT || — || align=right | 4.0 km || 
|-id=288 bgcolor=#E9E9E9
| 185288 ||  || — || October 23, 2006 || Kitt Peak || Spacewatch || — || align=right | 1.5 km || 
|-id=289 bgcolor=#E9E9E9
| 185289 ||  || — || October 20, 2006 || Goodricke-Pigott || R. A. Tucker || — || align=right | 2.3 km || 
|-id=290 bgcolor=#d6d6d6
| 185290 ||  || — || October 16, 2006 || Catalina || CSS || 4:3 || align=right | 9.5 km || 
|-id=291 bgcolor=#E9E9E9
| 185291 ||  || — || October 16, 2006 || Catalina || CSS || — || align=right | 3.1 km || 
|-id=292 bgcolor=#d6d6d6
| 185292 ||  || — || October 20, 2006 || Kitt Peak || Spacewatch || KAR || align=right | 1.6 km || 
|-id=293 bgcolor=#d6d6d6
| 185293 ||  || — || October 20, 2006 || Palomar || NEAT || KAR || align=right | 1.7 km || 
|-id=294 bgcolor=#E9E9E9
| 185294 ||  || — || October 23, 2006 || Kitt Peak || Spacewatch || — || align=right | 2.7 km || 
|-id=295 bgcolor=#E9E9E9
| 185295 ||  || — || October 23, 2006 || Kitt Peak || Spacewatch || — || align=right | 1.7 km || 
|-id=296 bgcolor=#d6d6d6
| 185296 ||  || — || October 23, 2006 || Kitt Peak || Spacewatch || KOR || align=right | 1.8 km || 
|-id=297 bgcolor=#d6d6d6
| 185297 ||  || — || October 27, 2006 || Mount Lemmon || Mount Lemmon Survey || — || align=right | 2.5 km || 
|-id=298 bgcolor=#fefefe
| 185298 ||  || — || October 28, 2006 || Kitt Peak || Spacewatch || — || align=right | 1.1 km || 
|-id=299 bgcolor=#fefefe
| 185299 ||  || — || October 28, 2006 || Mount Lemmon || Mount Lemmon Survey || NYS || align=right data-sort-value="0.84" | 840 m || 
|-id=300 bgcolor=#d6d6d6
| 185300 ||  || — || October 28, 2006 || Socorro || LINEAR || — || align=right | 7.1 km || 
|}

185301–185400 

|-bgcolor=#d6d6d6
| 185301 ||  || — || October 27, 2006 || Catalina || CSS || — || align=right | 6.7 km || 
|-id=302 bgcolor=#E9E9E9
| 185302 ||  || — || October 27, 2006 || Kitt Peak || Spacewatch || HOF || align=right | 2.4 km || 
|-id=303 bgcolor=#fefefe
| 185303 ||  || — || October 27, 2006 || Mount Lemmon || Mount Lemmon Survey || FLO || align=right data-sort-value="0.85" | 850 m || 
|-id=304 bgcolor=#E9E9E9
| 185304 ||  || — || October 27, 2006 || Kitt Peak || Spacewatch || HOF || align=right | 2.6 km || 
|-id=305 bgcolor=#fefefe
| 185305 ||  || — || October 28, 2006 || Kitt Peak || Spacewatch || CLA || align=right | 2.0 km || 
|-id=306 bgcolor=#E9E9E9
| 185306 ||  || — || October 28, 2006 || Mount Lemmon || Mount Lemmon Survey || — || align=right | 2.1 km || 
|-id=307 bgcolor=#fefefe
| 185307 ||  || — || October 28, 2006 || Kitt Peak || Spacewatch || — || align=right data-sort-value="0.92" | 920 m || 
|-id=308 bgcolor=#E9E9E9
| 185308 ||  || — || October 28, 2006 || Kitt Peak || Spacewatch || — || align=right | 1.6 km || 
|-id=309 bgcolor=#fefefe
| 185309 ||  || — || October 27, 2006 || Ottmarsheim || C. Rinner || — || align=right | 1.5 km || 
|-id=310 bgcolor=#E9E9E9
| 185310 ||  || — || October 19, 2006 || Kitt Peak || M. W. Buie || — || align=right | 1.5 km || 
|-id=311 bgcolor=#E9E9E9
| 185311 ||  || — || October 19, 2006 || Mount Lemmon || Mount Lemmon Survey || — || align=right | 1.4 km || 
|-id=312 bgcolor=#E9E9E9
| 185312 ||  || — || October 20, 2006 || Kitt Peak || M. W. Buie || — || align=right | 1.8 km || 
|-id=313 bgcolor=#fefefe
| 185313 ||  || — || October 17, 2006 || Kitt Peak || Spacewatch || V || align=right data-sort-value="0.84" | 840 m || 
|-id=314 bgcolor=#fefefe
| 185314 ||  || — || October 19, 2006 || Catalina || CSS || V || align=right data-sort-value="0.76" | 760 m || 
|-id=315 bgcolor=#E9E9E9
| 185315 ||  || — || October 19, 2006 || Mount Lemmon || Mount Lemmon Survey || — || align=right | 2.0 km || 
|-id=316 bgcolor=#d6d6d6
| 185316 ||  || — || October 21, 2006 || Kitt Peak || Spacewatch || KOR || align=right | 1.5 km || 
|-id=317 bgcolor=#d6d6d6
| 185317 ||  || — || October 23, 2006 || Catalina || CSS || — || align=right | 4.1 km || 
|-id=318 bgcolor=#d6d6d6
| 185318 ||  || — || October 16, 2006 || Apache Point || A. C. Becker || EOS || align=right | 2.3 km || 
|-id=319 bgcolor=#d6d6d6
| 185319 ||  || — || October 16, 2006 || Catalina || CSS || — || align=right | 3.1 km || 
|-id=320 bgcolor=#d6d6d6
| 185320 ||  || — || October 16, 2006 || Catalina || CSS || — || align=right | 5.4 km || 
|-id=321 bgcolor=#E9E9E9
| 185321 Kammerlander ||  ||  || November 10, 2006 || Vallemare di Borbona || V. S. Casulli || — || align=right | 3.0 km || 
|-id=322 bgcolor=#d6d6d6
| 185322 ||  || — || November 10, 2006 || Kitt Peak || Spacewatch || — || align=right | 2.6 km || 
|-id=323 bgcolor=#d6d6d6
| 185323 ||  || — || November 10, 2006 || Kitt Peak || Spacewatch || — || align=right | 5.9 km || 
|-id=324 bgcolor=#E9E9E9
| 185324 ||  || — || November 11, 2006 || Mount Lemmon || Mount Lemmon Survey || HOF || align=right | 3.1 km || 
|-id=325 bgcolor=#d6d6d6
| 185325 Anupabhagwat ||  ||  || November 14, 2006 || Vallemare di Borbona || V. S. Casulli || EOS || align=right | 4.7 km || 
|-id=326 bgcolor=#fefefe
| 185326 ||  || — || November 9, 2006 || Kitt Peak || Spacewatch || — || align=right | 1.3 km || 
|-id=327 bgcolor=#d6d6d6
| 185327 ||  || — || November 10, 2006 || Kitt Peak || Spacewatch || — || align=right | 2.9 km || 
|-id=328 bgcolor=#d6d6d6
| 185328 ||  || — || November 10, 2006 || Kitt Peak || Spacewatch || — || align=right | 3.0 km || 
|-id=329 bgcolor=#d6d6d6
| 185329 ||  || — || November 10, 2006 || Kitt Peak || Spacewatch || THM || align=right | 2.6 km || 
|-id=330 bgcolor=#d6d6d6
| 185330 ||  || — || November 10, 2006 || Kitt Peak || Spacewatch || KAR || align=right | 1.5 km || 
|-id=331 bgcolor=#E9E9E9
| 185331 ||  || — || November 10, 2006 || Kitt Peak || Spacewatch || — || align=right | 1.9 km || 
|-id=332 bgcolor=#E9E9E9
| 185332 ||  || — || November 11, 2006 || Mount Lemmon || Mount Lemmon Survey || — || align=right | 1.7 km || 
|-id=333 bgcolor=#E9E9E9
| 185333 ||  || — || November 11, 2006 || Catalina || CSS || — || align=right | 2.5 km || 
|-id=334 bgcolor=#E9E9E9
| 185334 ||  || — || November 11, 2006 || Catalina || CSS || — || align=right | 1.6 km || 
|-id=335 bgcolor=#fefefe
| 185335 ||  || — || November 11, 2006 || Mount Lemmon || Mount Lemmon Survey || — || align=right data-sort-value="0.83" | 830 m || 
|-id=336 bgcolor=#fefefe
| 185336 ||  || — || November 11, 2006 || Mount Lemmon || Mount Lemmon Survey || NYS || align=right data-sort-value="0.82" | 820 m || 
|-id=337 bgcolor=#fefefe
| 185337 ||  || — || November 11, 2006 || Catalina || CSS || FLO || align=right data-sort-value="0.98" | 980 m || 
|-id=338 bgcolor=#E9E9E9
| 185338 ||  || — || November 11, 2006 || Catalina || CSS || — || align=right | 1.7 km || 
|-id=339 bgcolor=#fefefe
| 185339 ||  || — || November 11, 2006 || Catalina || CSS || — || align=right | 1.6 km || 
|-id=340 bgcolor=#d6d6d6
| 185340 ||  || — || November 11, 2006 || Palomar || NEAT || LAU || align=right | 1.6 km || 
|-id=341 bgcolor=#fefefe
| 185341 ||  || — || November 12, 2006 || Catalina || CSS || FLO || align=right data-sort-value="0.87" | 870 m || 
|-id=342 bgcolor=#E9E9E9
| 185342 ||  || — || November 13, 2006 || Catalina || CSS || — || align=right | 1.7 km || 
|-id=343 bgcolor=#d6d6d6
| 185343 ||  || — || November 9, 2006 || Kitt Peak || Spacewatch || — || align=right | 3.5 km || 
|-id=344 bgcolor=#fefefe
| 185344 ||  || — || November 10, 2006 || Kitt Peak || Spacewatch || V || align=right data-sort-value="0.89" | 890 m || 
|-id=345 bgcolor=#d6d6d6
| 185345 ||  || — || November 11, 2006 || Kitt Peak || Spacewatch || — || align=right | 3.9 km || 
|-id=346 bgcolor=#d6d6d6
| 185346 ||  || — || November 11, 2006 || Kitt Peak || Spacewatch || — || align=right | 3.1 km || 
|-id=347 bgcolor=#E9E9E9
| 185347 ||  || — || November 11, 2006 || Kitt Peak || Spacewatch || — || align=right | 1.1 km || 
|-id=348 bgcolor=#d6d6d6
| 185348 ||  || — || November 11, 2006 || Kitt Peak || Spacewatch || K-2 || align=right | 1.8 km || 
|-id=349 bgcolor=#E9E9E9
| 185349 ||  || — || November 11, 2006 || Kitt Peak || Spacewatch || — || align=right | 2.0 km || 
|-id=350 bgcolor=#d6d6d6
| 185350 ||  || — || November 11, 2006 || Kitt Peak || Spacewatch || — || align=right | 2.9 km || 
|-id=351 bgcolor=#d6d6d6
| 185351 ||  || — || November 11, 2006 || Kitt Peak || Spacewatch || — || align=right | 3.0 km || 
|-id=352 bgcolor=#fefefe
| 185352 ||  || — || November 11, 2006 || Kitt Peak || Spacewatch || — || align=right | 1.0 km || 
|-id=353 bgcolor=#E9E9E9
| 185353 ||  || — || November 11, 2006 || Mount Lemmon || Mount Lemmon Survey || — || align=right | 2.7 km || 
|-id=354 bgcolor=#E9E9E9
| 185354 ||  || — || November 11, 2006 || Kitt Peak || Spacewatch || — || align=right | 2.9 km || 
|-id=355 bgcolor=#fefefe
| 185355 ||  || — || November 11, 2006 || Kitt Peak || Spacewatch || — || align=right | 1.8 km || 
|-id=356 bgcolor=#fefefe
| 185356 ||  || — || November 11, 2006 || Kitt Peak || Spacewatch || — || align=right data-sort-value="0.95" | 950 m || 
|-id=357 bgcolor=#d6d6d6
| 185357 ||  || — || November 12, 2006 || Mount Lemmon || Mount Lemmon Survey || — || align=right | 4.7 km || 
|-id=358 bgcolor=#fefefe
| 185358 ||  || — || November 13, 2006 || Kitt Peak || Spacewatch || NYS || align=right data-sort-value="0.91" | 910 m || 
|-id=359 bgcolor=#E9E9E9
| 185359 ||  || — || November 13, 2006 || Kitt Peak || Spacewatch || — || align=right | 3.5 km || 
|-id=360 bgcolor=#fefefe
| 185360 ||  || — || November 14, 2006 || Goodricke-Pigott || R. A. Tucker || V || align=right | 1.1 km || 
|-id=361 bgcolor=#E9E9E9
| 185361 ||  || — || November 15, 2006 || Kitt Peak || Spacewatch || — || align=right | 2.0 km || 
|-id=362 bgcolor=#E9E9E9
| 185362 ||  || — || November 10, 2006 || Kitt Peak || Spacewatch || — || align=right | 2.1 km || 
|-id=363 bgcolor=#E9E9E9
| 185363 ||  || — || November 10, 2006 || Kitt Peak || Spacewatch || — || align=right | 1.2 km || 
|-id=364 bgcolor=#fefefe
| 185364 Sunweihsin ||  ||  || November 12, 2006 || Lulin Observatory || H.-C. Lin, Q.-z. Ye || — || align=right | 1.2 km || 
|-id=365 bgcolor=#E9E9E9
| 185365 ||  || — || November 13, 2006 || Kitt Peak || Spacewatch || — || align=right | 1.9 km || 
|-id=366 bgcolor=#E9E9E9
| 185366 ||  || — || November 13, 2006 || Kitt Peak || Spacewatch || MAR || align=right | 1.8 km || 
|-id=367 bgcolor=#E9E9E9
| 185367 ||  || — || November 14, 2006 || Mount Lemmon || Mount Lemmon Survey || — || align=right | 1.6 km || 
|-id=368 bgcolor=#fefefe
| 185368 ||  || — || November 14, 2006 || Socorro || LINEAR || NYS || align=right data-sort-value="0.85" | 850 m || 
|-id=369 bgcolor=#d6d6d6
| 185369 ||  || — || November 14, 2006 || Kitt Peak || Spacewatch || KOR || align=right | 1.7 km || 
|-id=370 bgcolor=#fefefe
| 185370 ||  || — || November 14, 2006 || Mount Lemmon || Mount Lemmon Survey || V || align=right | 1.0 km || 
|-id=371 bgcolor=#d6d6d6
| 185371 ||  || — || November 14, 2006 || Kitt Peak || Spacewatch || THM || align=right | 2.5 km || 
|-id=372 bgcolor=#d6d6d6
| 185372 ||  || — || November 15, 2006 || Socorro || LINEAR || — || align=right | 7.0 km || 
|-id=373 bgcolor=#d6d6d6
| 185373 ||  || — || November 15, 2006 || Socorro || LINEAR || EOS || align=right | 3.5 km || 
|-id=374 bgcolor=#fefefe
| 185374 ||  || — || November 15, 2006 || Socorro || LINEAR || — || align=right | 1.3 km || 
|-id=375 bgcolor=#E9E9E9
| 185375 ||  || — || November 15, 2006 || Catalina || CSS || DOR || align=right | 2.5 km || 
|-id=376 bgcolor=#fefefe
| 185376 ||  || — || November 15, 2006 || Kitt Peak || Spacewatch || MAS || align=right | 1.0 km || 
|-id=377 bgcolor=#d6d6d6
| 185377 ||  || — || November 15, 2006 || Kitt Peak || Spacewatch || — || align=right | 3.2 km || 
|-id=378 bgcolor=#d6d6d6
| 185378 ||  || — || November 15, 2006 || Kitt Peak || Spacewatch || — || align=right | 3.4 km || 
|-id=379 bgcolor=#d6d6d6
| 185379 ||  || — || November 15, 2006 || Kitt Peak || Spacewatch || THM || align=right | 4.0 km || 
|-id=380 bgcolor=#E9E9E9
| 185380 ||  || — || November 14, 2006 || Socorro || LINEAR || IAN || align=right | 1.9 km || 
|-id=381 bgcolor=#E9E9E9
| 185381 ||  || — || November 14, 2006 || Socorro || LINEAR || — || align=right | 1.8 km || 
|-id=382 bgcolor=#E9E9E9
| 185382 ||  || — || November 8, 2006 || Palomar || NEAT || PAD || align=right | 2.4 km || 
|-id=383 bgcolor=#E9E9E9
| 185383 ||  || — || November 18, 2006 || 7300 Observatory || W. K. Y. Yeung || — || align=right | 3.8 km || 
|-id=384 bgcolor=#d6d6d6
| 185384 ||  || — || November 16, 2006 || Kitt Peak || Spacewatch || — || align=right | 3.3 km || 
|-id=385 bgcolor=#E9E9E9
| 185385 ||  || — || November 16, 2006 || Kitt Peak || Spacewatch || HOF || align=right | 3.0 km || 
|-id=386 bgcolor=#E9E9E9
| 185386 ||  || — || November 16, 2006 || Mount Lemmon || Mount Lemmon Survey || — || align=right | 1.2 km || 
|-id=387 bgcolor=#d6d6d6
| 185387 ||  || — || November 17, 2006 || Mount Lemmon || Mount Lemmon Survey || — || align=right | 3.4 km || 
|-id=388 bgcolor=#fefefe
| 185388 ||  || — || November 16, 2006 || Kitt Peak || Spacewatch || V || align=right data-sort-value="0.75" | 750 m || 
|-id=389 bgcolor=#d6d6d6
| 185389 ||  || — || November 16, 2006 || Mount Lemmon || Mount Lemmon Survey || — || align=right | 3.5 km || 
|-id=390 bgcolor=#E9E9E9
| 185390 ||  || — || November 16, 2006 || Kitt Peak || Spacewatch || WIT || align=right | 1.5 km || 
|-id=391 bgcolor=#d6d6d6
| 185391 ||  || — || November 16, 2006 || Kitt Peak || Spacewatch || — || align=right | 2.8 km || 
|-id=392 bgcolor=#d6d6d6
| 185392 ||  || — || November 16, 2006 || Kitt Peak || Spacewatch || — || align=right | 2.9 km || 
|-id=393 bgcolor=#E9E9E9
| 185393 ||  || — || November 17, 2006 || Kitt Peak || Spacewatch || — || align=right | 1.4 km || 
|-id=394 bgcolor=#d6d6d6
| 185394 ||  || — || November 17, 2006 || Catalina || CSS || TIR || align=right | 3.4 km || 
|-id=395 bgcolor=#E9E9E9
| 185395 ||  || — || November 18, 2006 || Kitt Peak || Spacewatch || — || align=right | 1.2 km || 
|-id=396 bgcolor=#d6d6d6
| 185396 ||  || — || November 18, 2006 || Kitt Peak || Spacewatch || KAR || align=right | 1.4 km || 
|-id=397 bgcolor=#E9E9E9
| 185397 ||  || — || November 18, 2006 || Kitt Peak || Spacewatch || — || align=right | 2.9 km || 
|-id=398 bgcolor=#fefefe
| 185398 ||  || — || November 19, 2006 || Kitt Peak || Spacewatch || MAS || align=right | 1.2 km || 
|-id=399 bgcolor=#d6d6d6
| 185399 ||  || — || November 19, 2006 || Kitt Peak || Spacewatch || — || align=right | 3.7 km || 
|-id=400 bgcolor=#E9E9E9
| 185400 ||  || — || November 19, 2006 || Kitt Peak || Spacewatch || HEN || align=right | 1.5 km || 
|}

185401–185500 

|-bgcolor=#fefefe
| 185401 ||  || — || November 19, 2006 || Catalina || CSS || V || align=right data-sort-value="0.96" | 960 m || 
|-id=402 bgcolor=#E9E9E9
| 185402 ||  || — || November 19, 2006 || Kitt Peak || Spacewatch || — || align=right | 2.5 km || 
|-id=403 bgcolor=#E9E9E9
| 185403 ||  || — || November 20, 2006 || Mount Lemmon || Mount Lemmon Survey || — || align=right | 1.4 km || 
|-id=404 bgcolor=#fefefe
| 185404 ||  || — || November 21, 2006 || Socorro || LINEAR || — || align=right | 1.7 km || 
|-id=405 bgcolor=#E9E9E9
| 185405 ||  || — || November 26, 2006 || 7300 Observatory || W. K. Y. Yeung || AST || align=right | 3.3 km || 
|-id=406 bgcolor=#d6d6d6
| 185406 ||  || — || November 26, 2006 || 7300 Observatory || W. K. Y. Yeung || THM || align=right | 3.9 km || 
|-id=407 bgcolor=#fefefe
| 185407 ||  || — || November 23, 2006 || Goodricke-Pigott || R. A. Tucker || — || align=right | 1.4 km || 
|-id=408 bgcolor=#fefefe
| 185408 ||  || — || November 17, 2006 || Mount Lemmon || Mount Lemmon Survey || — || align=right | 1.5 km || 
|-id=409 bgcolor=#d6d6d6
| 185409 ||  || — || November 20, 2006 || Kitt Peak || Spacewatch || — || align=right | 3.6 km || 
|-id=410 bgcolor=#d6d6d6
| 185410 ||  || — || November 20, 2006 || Kitt Peak || Spacewatch || KOR || align=right | 2.0 km || 
|-id=411 bgcolor=#fefefe
| 185411 ||  || — || November 22, 2006 || Socorro || LINEAR || FLO || align=right | 1.0 km || 
|-id=412 bgcolor=#E9E9E9
| 185412 ||  || — || November 23, 2006 || Kitt Peak || Spacewatch || HOF || align=right | 3.8 km || 
|-id=413 bgcolor=#E9E9E9
| 185413 ||  || — || November 23, 2006 || Kitt Peak || Spacewatch || — || align=right | 1.2 km || 
|-id=414 bgcolor=#fefefe
| 185414 ||  || — || November 23, 2006 || Kitt Peak || Spacewatch || — || align=right | 1.5 km || 
|-id=415 bgcolor=#E9E9E9
| 185415 ||  || — || November 23, 2006 || Kitt Peak || Spacewatch || — || align=right | 1.3 km || 
|-id=416 bgcolor=#E9E9E9
| 185416 ||  || — || November 23, 2006 || Kitt Peak || Spacewatch || — || align=right | 2.7 km || 
|-id=417 bgcolor=#fefefe
| 185417 ||  || — || November 23, 2006 || Kitt Peak || Spacewatch || — || align=right | 1.2 km || 
|-id=418 bgcolor=#E9E9E9
| 185418 ||  || — || November 24, 2006 || Mount Lemmon || Mount Lemmon Survey || — || align=right | 1.9 km || 
|-id=419 bgcolor=#E9E9E9
| 185419 ||  || — || November 17, 2006 || Palomar || NEAT || — || align=right | 1.5 km || 
|-id=420 bgcolor=#fefefe
| 185420 ||  || — || November 27, 2006 || Kitt Peak || Spacewatch || — || align=right | 1.0 km || 
|-id=421 bgcolor=#E9E9E9
| 185421 ||  || — || November 27, 2006 || Kitt Peak || Spacewatch || — || align=right | 2.1 km || 
|-id=422 bgcolor=#E9E9E9
| 185422 ||  || — || November 27, 2006 || Kitt Peak || Spacewatch || HEN || align=right | 1.5 km || 
|-id=423 bgcolor=#E9E9E9
| 185423 || 2006 XM || — || December 10, 2006 || RAS || A. Lowe || EUN || align=right | 2.2 km || 
|-id=424 bgcolor=#E9E9E9
| 185424 ||  || — || December 2, 2006 || Socorro || LINEAR || — || align=right | 3.4 km || 
|-id=425 bgcolor=#E9E9E9
| 185425 ||  || — || December 9, 2006 || Kitt Peak || Spacewatch || — || align=right | 1.5 km || 
|-id=426 bgcolor=#E9E9E9
| 185426 ||  || — || December 9, 2006 || Palomar || NEAT || — || align=right | 1.6 km || 
|-id=427 bgcolor=#d6d6d6
| 185427 ||  || — || December 9, 2006 || Palomar || NEAT || EOS || align=right | 2.8 km || 
|-id=428 bgcolor=#d6d6d6
| 185428 ||  || — || December 9, 2006 || Kitt Peak || Spacewatch || — || align=right | 7.2 km || 
|-id=429 bgcolor=#E9E9E9
| 185429 ||  || — || December 10, 2006 || Kitt Peak || Spacewatch || — || align=right | 2.0 km || 
|-id=430 bgcolor=#d6d6d6
| 185430 ||  || — || December 12, 2006 || Kitt Peak || Spacewatch || — || align=right | 3.4 km || 
|-id=431 bgcolor=#E9E9E9
| 185431 ||  || — || December 12, 2006 || Catalina || CSS || — || align=right | 1.7 km || 
|-id=432 bgcolor=#d6d6d6
| 185432 ||  || — || December 12, 2006 || Catalina || CSS || EOS || align=right | 5.7 km || 
|-id=433 bgcolor=#fefefe
| 185433 ||  || — || December 13, 2006 || Kitt Peak || Spacewatch || — || align=right | 1.4 km || 
|-id=434 bgcolor=#E9E9E9
| 185434 ||  || — || December 13, 2006 || Eskridge || Farpoint Obs. || — || align=right | 2.4 km || 
|-id=435 bgcolor=#E9E9E9
| 185435 ||  || — || December 11, 2006 || Kitt Peak || Spacewatch || — || align=right | 1.7 km || 
|-id=436 bgcolor=#d6d6d6
| 185436 ||  || — || December 11, 2006 || Kitt Peak || Spacewatch || — || align=right | 4.5 km || 
|-id=437 bgcolor=#E9E9E9
| 185437 ||  || — || December 13, 2006 || Mount Lemmon || Mount Lemmon Survey || — || align=right | 2.7 km || 
|-id=438 bgcolor=#E9E9E9
| 185438 ||  || — || December 13, 2006 || Kitt Peak || Spacewatch || — || align=right | 3.7 km || 
|-id=439 bgcolor=#E9E9E9
| 185439 ||  || — || December 13, 2006 || Mount Lemmon || Mount Lemmon Survey || AGN || align=right | 2.0 km || 
|-id=440 bgcolor=#d6d6d6
| 185440 ||  || — || December 14, 2006 || Socorro || LINEAR || — || align=right | 5.8 km || 
|-id=441 bgcolor=#E9E9E9
| 185441 ||  || — || December 15, 2006 || Socorro || LINEAR || — || align=right | 2.0 km || 
|-id=442 bgcolor=#E9E9E9
| 185442 ||  || — || December 15, 2006 || Socorro || LINEAR || — || align=right | 1.5 km || 
|-id=443 bgcolor=#d6d6d6
| 185443 ||  || — || December 14, 2006 || Catalina || CSS || — || align=right | 4.8 km || 
|-id=444 bgcolor=#E9E9E9
| 185444 ||  || — || December 14, 2006 || Kitt Peak || Spacewatch || HOF || align=right | 3.7 km || 
|-id=445 bgcolor=#d6d6d6
| 185445 ||  || — || December 17, 2006 || 7300 Observatory || W. K. Y. Yeung || — || align=right | 6.6 km || 
|-id=446 bgcolor=#E9E9E9
| 185446 ||  || — || December 17, 2006 || Mount Lemmon || Mount Lemmon Survey || HEN || align=right | 1.3 km || 
|-id=447 bgcolor=#fefefe
| 185447 ||  || — || December 18, 2006 || Nyukasa || Mount Nyukasa Stn. || MAS || align=right | 1.2 km || 
|-id=448 bgcolor=#d6d6d6
| 185448 Nomentum ||  ||  || December 25, 2006 || Vallemare di Borbona || V. S. Casulli || EOS || align=right | 3.9 km || 
|-id=449 bgcolor=#E9E9E9
| 185449 ||  || — || December 21, 2006 || Kitt Peak || Spacewatch || — || align=right | 2.7 km || 
|-id=450 bgcolor=#d6d6d6
| 185450 ||  || — || December 21, 2006 || Kitt Peak || Spacewatch || EOS || align=right | 3.0 km || 
|-id=451 bgcolor=#d6d6d6
| 185451 ||  || — || December 21, 2006 || Kitt Peak || Spacewatch || KOR || align=right | 1.7 km || 
|-id=452 bgcolor=#d6d6d6
| 185452 ||  || — || December 22, 2006 || Kitt Peak || Spacewatch || KOR || align=right | 1.6 km || 
|-id=453 bgcolor=#E9E9E9
| 185453 ||  || — || December 22, 2006 || Kitt Peak || Spacewatch || — || align=right | 1.3 km || 
|-id=454 bgcolor=#d6d6d6
| 185454 ||  || — || December 21, 2006 || Catalina || CSS || THM || align=right | 2.6 km || 
|-id=455 bgcolor=#d6d6d6
| 185455 ||  || — || December 22, 2006 || Kitt Peak || Spacewatch || THM || align=right | 2.8 km || 
|-id=456 bgcolor=#d6d6d6
| 185456 || 2007 AT || — || January 8, 2007 || Mount Lemmon || Mount Lemmon Survey || KOR || align=right | 1.9 km || 
|-id=457 bgcolor=#E9E9E9
| 185457 ||  || — || January 8, 2007 || Socorro || LINEAR || BRU || align=right | 4.8 km || 
|-id=458 bgcolor=#d6d6d6
| 185458 ||  || — || January 8, 2007 || Kitt Peak || Spacewatch || — || align=right | 5.1 km || 
|-id=459 bgcolor=#d6d6d6
| 185459 ||  || — || January 9, 2007 || Mount Lemmon || Mount Lemmon Survey || VER || align=right | 5.3 km || 
|-id=460 bgcolor=#d6d6d6
| 185460 ||  || — || January 9, 2007 || Mount Lemmon || Mount Lemmon Survey || — || align=right | 4.9 km || 
|-id=461 bgcolor=#d6d6d6
| 185461 ||  || — || January 16, 2007 || Catalina || CSS || — || align=right | 4.7 km || 
|-id=462 bgcolor=#d6d6d6
| 185462 ||  || — || January 16, 2007 || Catalina || CSS || EOS || align=right | 3.0 km || 
|-id=463 bgcolor=#d6d6d6
| 185463 ||  || — || January 16, 2007 || Catalina || CSS || EUP || align=right | 6.5 km || 
|-id=464 bgcolor=#d6d6d6
| 185464 ||  || — || January 17, 2007 || Catalina || CSS || 7:4 || align=right | 9.0 km || 
|-id=465 bgcolor=#fefefe
| 185465 ||  || — || January 17, 2007 || Palomar || NEAT || — || align=right | 1.5 km || 
|-id=466 bgcolor=#d6d6d6
| 185466 ||  || — || January 24, 2007 || Mount Lemmon || Mount Lemmon Survey || — || align=right | 3.7 km || 
|-id=467 bgcolor=#d6d6d6
| 185467 ||  || — || January 24, 2007 || Mount Lemmon || Mount Lemmon Survey || — || align=right | 3.3 km || 
|-id=468 bgcolor=#d6d6d6
| 185468 ||  || — || January 24, 2007 || Catalina || CSS || — || align=right | 5.9 km || 
|-id=469 bgcolor=#d6d6d6
| 185469 ||  || — || January 25, 2007 || Kitt Peak || Spacewatch || — || align=right | 3.3 km || 
|-id=470 bgcolor=#d6d6d6
| 185470 ||  || — || January 25, 2007 || Socorro || LINEAR || — || align=right | 4.1 km || 
|-id=471 bgcolor=#d6d6d6
| 185471 ||  || — || January 26, 2007 || Kitt Peak || Spacewatch || EOS || align=right | 3.3 km || 
|-id=472 bgcolor=#d6d6d6
| 185472 ||  || — || January 27, 2007 || Mount Lemmon || Mount Lemmon Survey || KOR || align=right | 1.8 km || 
|-id=473 bgcolor=#d6d6d6
| 185473 ||  || — || January 27, 2007 || Mount Lemmon || Mount Lemmon Survey || — || align=right | 3.9 km || 
|-id=474 bgcolor=#d6d6d6
| 185474 ||  || — || January 17, 2007 || Kitt Peak || Spacewatch || HYG || align=right | 4.4 km || 
|-id=475 bgcolor=#d6d6d6
| 185475 ||  || — || January 27, 2007 || Kitt Peak || Spacewatch || — || align=right | 3.3 km || 
|-id=476 bgcolor=#d6d6d6
| 185476 ||  || — || February 6, 2007 || Mount Lemmon || Mount Lemmon Survey || — || align=right | 3.0 km || 
|-id=477 bgcolor=#E9E9E9
| 185477 ||  || — || February 6, 2007 || Kitt Peak || Spacewatch || — || align=right | 1.2 km || 
|-id=478 bgcolor=#d6d6d6
| 185478 ||  || — || February 6, 2007 || Palomar || NEAT || EMA || align=right | 6.4 km || 
|-id=479 bgcolor=#fefefe
| 185479 ||  || — || February 6, 2007 || Mount Lemmon || Mount Lemmon Survey || — || align=right | 1.3 km || 
|-id=480 bgcolor=#d6d6d6
| 185480 ||  || — || February 6, 2007 || Kitt Peak || Spacewatch || EOS || align=right | 3.1 km || 
|-id=481 bgcolor=#E9E9E9
| 185481 ||  || — || February 6, 2007 || Mount Lemmon || Mount Lemmon Survey || AGN || align=right | 1.6 km || 
|-id=482 bgcolor=#d6d6d6
| 185482 ||  || — || February 6, 2007 || Mount Lemmon || Mount Lemmon Survey || HYG || align=right | 4.0 km || 
|-id=483 bgcolor=#d6d6d6
| 185483 ||  || — || February 17, 2007 || Kitt Peak || Spacewatch || ALA || align=right | 7.0 km || 
|-id=484 bgcolor=#d6d6d6
| 185484 ||  || — || February 22, 2007 || Antares || ARO || SYL7:4 || align=right | 5.9 km || 
|-id=485 bgcolor=#C2FFFF
| 185485 ||  || — || March 10, 2007 || Kitt Peak || Spacewatch || L5 || align=right | 10 km || 
|-id=486 bgcolor=#C2FFFF
| 185486 ||  || — || March 10, 2007 || Kitt Peak || Spacewatch || L5 || align=right | 12 km || 
|-id=487 bgcolor=#C2FFFF
| 185487 ||  || — || March 12, 2007 || Kitt Peak || Spacewatch || L5 || align=right | 12 km || 
|-id=488 bgcolor=#d6d6d6
| 185488 ||  || — || March 14, 2007 || Mount Lemmon || Mount Lemmon Survey || — || align=right | 3.0 km || 
|-id=489 bgcolor=#C2FFFF
| 185489 ||  || — || March 25, 2007 || Mount Lemmon || Mount Lemmon Survey || L5 || align=right | 9.9 km || 
|-id=490 bgcolor=#C2FFFF
| 185490 ||  || — || April 9, 2007 || Bergen-Enkheim || Bergen-Enkheim Obs. || L5 || align=right | 16 km || 
|-id=491 bgcolor=#fefefe
| 185491 ||  || — || April 9, 2007 || Kitt Peak || Spacewatch || MAS || align=right data-sort-value="0.93" | 930 m || 
|-id=492 bgcolor=#C2FFFF
| 185492 ||  || — || April 18, 2007 || Anderson Mesa || LONEOS || L5slow || align=right | 12 km || 
|-id=493 bgcolor=#FA8072
| 185493 ||  || — || August 13, 2007 || Socorro || LINEAR || — || align=right | 1.4 km || 
|-id=494 bgcolor=#d6d6d6
| 185494 ||  || — || September 5, 2007 || Anderson Mesa || LONEOS || — || align=right | 3.7 km || 
|-id=495 bgcolor=#fefefe
| 185495 ||  || — || September 13, 2007 || Socorro || LINEAR || MAS || align=right | 1.2 km || 
|-id=496 bgcolor=#d6d6d6
| 185496 ||  || — || September 13, 2007 || Socorro || LINEAR || THM || align=right | 3.3 km || 
|-id=497 bgcolor=#fefefe
| 185497 ||  || — || September 14, 2007 || Mount Lemmon || Mount Lemmon Survey || NYS || align=right data-sort-value="0.79" | 790 m || 
|-id=498 bgcolor=#fefefe
| 185498 Majorcastroinst || 2007 SN ||  || September 17, 2007 || OAM || OAM Obs. || — || align=right | 1.7 km || 
|-id=499 bgcolor=#d6d6d6
| 185499 ||  || — || October 6, 2007 || Kitt Peak || Spacewatch || KOR || align=right | 2.0 km || 
|-id=500 bgcolor=#E9E9E9
| 185500 ||  || — || October 4, 2007 || Kitt Peak || Spacewatch || AST || align=right | 3.8 km || 
|}

185501–185600 

|-bgcolor=#E9E9E9
| 185501 ||  || — || October 4, 2007 || Kitt Peak || Spacewatch || AGN || align=right | 1.6 km || 
|-id=502 bgcolor=#d6d6d6
| 185502 ||  || — || October 6, 2007 || Kitt Peak || Spacewatch || THM || align=right | 4.4 km || 
|-id=503 bgcolor=#d6d6d6
| 185503 ||  || — || October 11, 2007 || Socorro || LINEAR || — || align=right | 3.5 km || 
|-id=504 bgcolor=#E9E9E9
| 185504 ||  || — || October 8, 2007 || Kitt Peak || Spacewatch || HEN || align=right | 1.9 km || 
|-id=505 bgcolor=#E9E9E9
| 185505 ||  || — || October 12, 2007 || Anderson Mesa || LONEOS || — || align=right | 3.6 km || 
|-id=506 bgcolor=#d6d6d6
| 185506 ||  || — || October 12, 2007 || Kitt Peak || Spacewatch || — || align=right | 3.8 km || 
|-id=507 bgcolor=#fefefe
| 185507 ||  || — || October 11, 2007 || Kitt Peak || Spacewatch || MAS || align=right data-sort-value="0.77" | 770 m || 
|-id=508 bgcolor=#d6d6d6
| 185508 ||  || — || October 11, 2007 || Kitt Peak || Spacewatch || KOR || align=right | 2.1 km || 
|-id=509 bgcolor=#d6d6d6
| 185509 ||  || — || October 14, 2007 || Mount Lemmon || Mount Lemmon Survey || — || align=right | 3.2 km || 
|-id=510 bgcolor=#d6d6d6
| 185510 ||  || — || October 14, 2007 || Mount Lemmon || Mount Lemmon Survey || — || align=right | 3.6 km || 
|-id=511 bgcolor=#fefefe
| 185511 ||  || — || October 15, 2007 || Lulin Observatory || LUSS || NYS || align=right | 2.5 km || 
|-id=512 bgcolor=#fefefe
| 185512 || 2007 UL || — || October 16, 2007 || RAS || A. Lowe || — || align=right | 1.1 km || 
|-id=513 bgcolor=#d6d6d6
| 185513 ||  || — || October 20, 2007 || Catalina || CSS || — || align=right | 3.7 km || 
|-id=514 bgcolor=#fefefe
| 185514 ||  || — || October 30, 2007 || Mount Lemmon || Mount Lemmon Survey || MAS || align=right | 1.2 km || 
|-id=515 bgcolor=#E9E9E9
| 185515 ||  || — || October 30, 2007 || Kitt Peak || Spacewatch || — || align=right | 1.8 km || 
|-id=516 bgcolor=#fefefe
| 185516 ||  || — || October 31, 2007 || Kitt Peak || Spacewatch || — || align=right | 1.0 km || 
|-id=517 bgcolor=#d6d6d6
| 185517 ||  || — || November 2, 2007 || Kitt Peak || Spacewatch || — || align=right | 4.2 km || 
|-id=518 bgcolor=#E9E9E9
| 185518 ||  || — || November 1, 2007 || Kitt Peak || Spacewatch || GEF || align=right | 2.2 km || 
|-id=519 bgcolor=#E9E9E9
| 185519 ||  || — || November 1, 2007 || Kitt Peak || Spacewatch || — || align=right | 1.9 km || 
|-id=520 bgcolor=#d6d6d6
| 185520 ||  || — || November 1, 2007 || Kitt Peak || Spacewatch || — || align=right | 3.3 km || 
|-id=521 bgcolor=#d6d6d6
| 185521 ||  || — || November 2, 2007 || Kitt Peak || Spacewatch || — || align=right | 3.2 km || 
|-id=522 bgcolor=#E9E9E9
| 185522 ||  || — || November 3, 2007 || Kitt Peak || Spacewatch || — || align=right | 1.9 km || 
|-id=523 bgcolor=#fefefe
| 185523 ||  || — || November 4, 2007 || Kitt Peak || Spacewatch || V || align=right data-sort-value="0.97" | 970 m || 
|-id=524 bgcolor=#E9E9E9
| 185524 ||  || — || November 5, 2007 || Kitt Peak || Spacewatch || — || align=right | 2.9 km || 
|-id=525 bgcolor=#fefefe
| 185525 ||  || — || November 5, 2007 || Mount Lemmon || Mount Lemmon Survey || MAS || align=right | 1.0 km || 
|-id=526 bgcolor=#d6d6d6
| 185526 ||  || — || November 8, 2007 || Kitt Peak || Spacewatch || — || align=right | 3.7 km || 
|-id=527 bgcolor=#E9E9E9
| 185527 ||  || — || November 13, 2007 || Anderson Mesa || LONEOS || — || align=right | 1.7 km || 
|-id=528 bgcolor=#d6d6d6
| 185528 ||  || — || November 11, 2007 || OAM || OAM Obs. || — || align=right | 4.2 km || 
|-id=529 bgcolor=#d6d6d6
| 185529 ||  || — || November 17, 2007 || Catalina || CSS || VER || align=right | 4.7 km || 
|-id=530 bgcolor=#d6d6d6
| 185530 ||  || — || November 17, 2007 || Kitt Peak || Spacewatch || EOS || align=right | 3.2 km || 
|-id=531 bgcolor=#d6d6d6
| 185531 ||  || — || November 18, 2007 || Mount Lemmon || Mount Lemmon Survey || KOR || align=right | 1.9 km || 
|-id=532 bgcolor=#d6d6d6
| 185532 ||  || — || November 18, 2007 || Mount Lemmon || Mount Lemmon Survey || SYL7:4 || align=right | 6.1 km || 
|-id=533 bgcolor=#E9E9E9
| 185533 ||  || — || November 17, 2007 || Eskridge || Farpoint Obs. || AST || align=right | 3.5 km || 
|-id=534 bgcolor=#d6d6d6
| 185534 ||  || — || November 19, 2007 || Mount Lemmon || Mount Lemmon Survey || — || align=right | 4.7 km || 
|-id=535 bgcolor=#E9E9E9
| 185535 Gangda ||  ||  || November 28, 2007 || Purple Mountain || PMO NEO || — || align=right | 4.5 km || 
|-id=536 bgcolor=#d6d6d6
| 185536 ||  || — || December 3, 2007 || Catalina || CSS || KOR || align=right | 2.3 km || 
|-id=537 bgcolor=#E9E9E9
| 185537 ||  || — || December 4, 2007 || Kitt Peak || Spacewatch || — || align=right | 2.2 km || 
|-id=538 bgcolor=#E9E9E9
| 185538 Fangcheng ||  ||  || December 14, 2007 || Purple Mountain || PMO NEO || — || align=right | 2.6 km || 
|-id=539 bgcolor=#E9E9E9
| 185539 ||  || — || December 15, 2007 || Kitt Peak || Spacewatch || HEN || align=right | 1.3 km || 
|-id=540 bgcolor=#E9E9E9
| 185540 ||  || — || December 15, 2007 || Kitt Peak || Spacewatch || AGN || align=right | 2.0 km || 
|-id=541 bgcolor=#d6d6d6
| 185541 ||  || — || December 15, 2007 || Kitt Peak || Spacewatch || — || align=right | 3.9 km || 
|-id=542 bgcolor=#fefefe
| 185542 ||  || — || December 13, 2007 || Socorro || LINEAR || — || align=right | 1.4 km || 
|-id=543 bgcolor=#fefefe
| 185543 ||  || — || December 13, 2007 || Socorro || LINEAR || — || align=right | 1.6 km || 
|-id=544 bgcolor=#fefefe
| 185544 ||  || — || December 18, 2007 || Mount Lemmon || Mount Lemmon Survey || H || align=right | 1.0 km || 
|-id=545 bgcolor=#E9E9E9
| 185545 ||  || — || December 28, 2007 || Kitt Peak || Spacewatch || HEN || align=right | 1.5 km || 
|-id=546 bgcolor=#fefefe
| 185546 Yushan ||  ||  || December 28, 2007 || Lulin Observatory || Q.-z. Ye, C.-S. Lin || MAS || align=right data-sort-value="0.87" | 870 m || 
|-id=547 bgcolor=#d6d6d6
| 185547 ||  || — || December 28, 2007 || Kitt Peak || Spacewatch || — || align=right | 4.0 km || 
|-id=548 bgcolor=#fefefe
| 185548 ||  || — || December 30, 2007 || Mount Lemmon || Mount Lemmon Survey || critical || align=right data-sort-value="0.75" | 750 m || 
|-id=549 bgcolor=#fefefe
| 185549 ||  || — || December 30, 2007 || Catalina || CSS || — || align=right | 1.4 km || 
|-id=550 bgcolor=#d6d6d6
| 185550 ||  || — || December 28, 2007 || Kitt Peak || Spacewatch || — || align=right | 3.4 km || 
|-id=551 bgcolor=#fefefe
| 185551 ||  || — || December 30, 2007 || Catalina || CSS || FLO || align=right data-sort-value="0.88" | 880 m || 
|-id=552 bgcolor=#d6d6d6
| 185552 ||  || — || December 31, 2007 || Catalina || CSS || — || align=right | 3.1 km || 
|-id=553 bgcolor=#fefefe
| 185553 ||  || — || January 7, 2008 || Lulin Observatory || LUSS || MAS || align=right data-sort-value="0.78" | 780 m || 
|-id=554 bgcolor=#d6d6d6
| 185554 Bikushev ||  ||  || January 7, 2008 || Lulin Observatory || Q.-z. Ye || TEL || align=right | 2.2 km || 
|-id=555 bgcolor=#fefefe
| 185555 ||  || — || January 10, 2008 || Kitt Peak || Spacewatch || NYS || align=right data-sort-value="0.82" | 820 m || 
|-id=556 bgcolor=#d6d6d6
| 185556 ||  || — || January 10, 2008 || Kitt Peak || Spacewatch || KOR || align=right | 2.0 km || 
|-id=557 bgcolor=#fefefe
| 185557 ||  || — || January 10, 2008 || Mount Lemmon || Mount Lemmon Survey || V || align=right data-sort-value="0.87" | 870 m || 
|-id=558 bgcolor=#d6d6d6
| 185558 ||  || — || January 10, 2008 || Mount Lemmon || Mount Lemmon Survey || — || align=right | 4.1 km || 
|-id=559 bgcolor=#d6d6d6
| 185559 ||  || — || January 10, 2008 || Mount Lemmon || Mount Lemmon Survey || — || align=right | 2.2 km || 
|-id=560 bgcolor=#fefefe
| 185560 Harrykroto ||  ||  || January 7, 2008 || OAM || OAM Obs. || — || align=right | 1.1 km || 
|-id=561 bgcolor=#d6d6d6
| 185561 Miquelsiquier ||  ||  || January 12, 2008 || OAM || OAM Obs. || — || align=right | 3.9 km || 
|-id=562 bgcolor=#fefefe
| 185562 ||  || — || January 13, 2008 || Mallorca || OAM Obs. || — || align=right | 1.1 km || 
|-id=563 bgcolor=#fefefe
| 185563 ||  || — || January 10, 2008 || Kitt Peak || Spacewatch || — || align=right | 1.0 km || 
|-id=564 bgcolor=#fefefe
| 185564 ||  || — || January 10, 2008 || Catalina || CSS || — || align=right | 1.2 km || 
|-id=565 bgcolor=#d6d6d6
| 185565 ||  || — || January 10, 2008 || Catalina || CSS || — || align=right | 4.9 km || 
|-id=566 bgcolor=#fefefe
| 185566 ||  || — || January 10, 2008 || Kitt Peak || Spacewatch || — || align=right data-sort-value="0.82" | 820 m || 
|-id=567 bgcolor=#fefefe
| 185567 ||  || — || January 11, 2008 || Kitt Peak || Spacewatch || — || align=right data-sort-value="0.82" | 820 m || 
|-id=568 bgcolor=#fefefe
| 185568 ||  || — || January 12, 2008 || Kitt Peak || Spacewatch || MAS || align=right | 1.1 km || 
|-id=569 bgcolor=#d6d6d6
| 185569 ||  || — || January 12, 2008 || Kitt Peak || Spacewatch || — || align=right | 4.1 km || 
|-id=570 bgcolor=#d6d6d6
| 185570 ||  || — || January 12, 2008 || Kitt Peak || Spacewatch || — || align=right | 3.7 km || 
|-id=571 bgcolor=#fefefe
| 185571 ||  || — || January 14, 2008 || Kitt Peak || Spacewatch || NYS || align=right data-sort-value="0.90" | 900 m || 
|-id=572 bgcolor=#E9E9E9
| 185572 ||  || — || January 15, 2008 || Mount Lemmon || Mount Lemmon Survey || — || align=right | 2.2 km || 
|-id=573 bgcolor=#fefefe
| 185573 ||  || — || January 15, 2008 || Mount Lemmon || Mount Lemmon Survey || — || align=right | 1.0 km || 
|-id=574 bgcolor=#fefefe
| 185574 ||  || — || January 16, 2008 || Kitt Peak || Spacewatch || — || align=right | 1.0 km || 
|-id=575 bgcolor=#E9E9E9
| 185575 ||  || — || January 29, 2008 || Junk Bond || D. Healy || — || align=right | 2.7 km || 
|-id=576 bgcolor=#fefefe
| 185576 Covichi ||  ||  || January 26, 2008 || La Cañada || J. Lacruz || MAS || align=right data-sort-value="0.99" | 990 m || 
|-id=577 bgcolor=#d6d6d6
| 185577 Hhaihao ||  ||  || January 28, 2008 || Lulin Observatory || Q.-z. Ye, H.-C. Lin || — || align=right | 2.8 km || 
|-id=578 bgcolor=#E9E9E9
| 185578 Agustinelcasta ||  ||  || January 28, 2008 || OAM || OAM Obs. || — || align=right | 1.4 km || 
|-id=579 bgcolor=#fefefe
| 185579 Jorgejuan ||  ||  || January 29, 2008 || OAM || OAM Obs. || V || align=right data-sort-value="0.95" | 950 m || 
|-id=580 bgcolor=#fefefe
| 185580 Andratx ||  ||  || January 29, 2008 || OAM || OAM Obs. || — || align=right | 1.1 km || 
|-id=581 bgcolor=#fefefe
| 185581 ||  || — || January 30, 2008 || Catalina || CSS || — || align=right | 1.1 km || 
|-id=582 bgcolor=#E9E9E9
| 185582 ||  || — || January 30, 2008 || Mount Lemmon || Mount Lemmon Survey || — || align=right | 3.1 km || 
|-id=583 bgcolor=#fefefe
| 185583 ||  || — || January 31, 2008 || Mount Lemmon || Mount Lemmon Survey || MAS || align=right | 1.0 km || 
|-id=584 bgcolor=#d6d6d6
| 185584 ||  || — || January 31, 2008 || Mount Lemmon || Mount Lemmon Survey || — || align=right | 3.6 km || 
|-id=585 bgcolor=#E9E9E9
| 185585 ||  || — || January 31, 2008 || Mount Lemmon || Mount Lemmon Survey || WIT || align=right | 1.5 km || 
|-id=586 bgcolor=#fefefe
| 185586 ||  || — || January 30, 2008 || Kitt Peak || Spacewatch || NYS || align=right data-sort-value="0.83" | 830 m || 
|-id=587 bgcolor=#E9E9E9
| 185587 ||  || — || January 30, 2008 || OAM || OAM Obs. || — || align=right | 2.2 km || 
|-id=588 bgcolor=#d6d6d6
| 185588 ||  || — || January 30, 2008 || Catalina || CSS || — || align=right | 5.1 km || 
|-id=589 bgcolor=#fefefe
| 185589 ||  || — || January 30, 2008 || Mount Lemmon || Mount Lemmon Survey || FLO || align=right data-sort-value="0.74" | 740 m || 
|-id=590 bgcolor=#fefefe
| 185590 ||  || — || January 30, 2008 || Kitt Peak || Spacewatch || — || align=right | 1.2 km || 
|-id=591 bgcolor=#fefefe
| 185591 ||  || — || January 30, 2008 || Kitt Peak || Spacewatch || NYS || align=right | 1.3 km || 
|-id=592 bgcolor=#d6d6d6
| 185592 ||  || — || January 30, 2008 || Kitt Peak || Spacewatch || — || align=right | 4.8 km || 
|-id=593 bgcolor=#d6d6d6
| 185593 ||  || — || January 30, 2008 || Catalina || CSS || HYG || align=right | 3.9 km || 
|-id=594 bgcolor=#E9E9E9
| 185594 ||  || — || January 31, 2008 || Catalina || CSS || — || align=right | 4.0 km || 
|-id=595 bgcolor=#E9E9E9
| 185595 ||  || — || February 1, 2008 || Mount Lemmon || Mount Lemmon Survey || — || align=right | 3.0 km || 
|-id=596 bgcolor=#fefefe
| 185596 ||  || — || February 2, 2008 || Kitt Peak || Spacewatch || NYS || align=right data-sort-value="0.87" | 870 m || 
|-id=597 bgcolor=#fefefe
| 185597 ||  || — || February 2, 2008 || Kitt Peak || Spacewatch || FLO || align=right data-sort-value="0.72" | 720 m || 
|-id=598 bgcolor=#fefefe
| 185598 ||  || — || February 7, 2008 || RAS || A. Lowe || H || align=right data-sort-value="0.75" | 750 m || 
|-id=599 bgcolor=#d6d6d6
| 185599 ||  || — || February 2, 2008 || Kitt Peak || Spacewatch || HIL3:2 || align=right | 8.4 km || 
|-id=600 bgcolor=#fefefe
| 185600 ||  || — || February 3, 2008 || Kitt Peak || Spacewatch || V || align=right | 1.2 km || 
|}

185601–185700 

|-bgcolor=#fefefe
| 185601 ||  || — || February 3, 2008 || Mount Lemmon || Mount Lemmon Survey || — || align=right | 1.5 km || 
|-id=602 bgcolor=#fefefe
| 185602 ||  || — || February 1, 2008 || Kitt Peak || Spacewatch || NYS || align=right data-sort-value="0.72" | 720 m || 
|-id=603 bgcolor=#fefefe
| 185603 ||  || — || February 1, 2008 || Kitt Peak || Spacewatch || — || align=right | 1.4 km || 
|-id=604 bgcolor=#d6d6d6
| 185604 ||  || — || February 1, 2008 || Kitt Peak || Spacewatch || — || align=right | 3.8 km || 
|-id=605 bgcolor=#d6d6d6
| 185605 ||  || — || February 1, 2008 || Catalina || CSS || — || align=right | 5.7 km || 
|-id=606 bgcolor=#E9E9E9
| 185606 ||  || — || February 2, 2008 || Kitt Peak || Spacewatch || AGN || align=right | 1.2 km || 
|-id=607 bgcolor=#d6d6d6
| 185607 ||  || — || February 2, 2008 || Kitt Peak || Spacewatch || — || align=right | 2.9 km || 
|-id=608 bgcolor=#d6d6d6
| 185608 ||  || — || February 2, 2008 || Kitt Peak || Spacewatch || — || align=right | 4.9 km || 
|-id=609 bgcolor=#fefefe
| 185609 ||  || — || February 2, 2008 || Kitt Peak || Spacewatch || FLO || align=right | 1.0 km || 
|-id=610 bgcolor=#E9E9E9
| 185610 ||  || — || February 2, 2008 || Kitt Peak || Spacewatch || — || align=right | 1.9 km || 
|-id=611 bgcolor=#E9E9E9
| 185611 ||  || — || February 2, 2008 || Kitt Peak || Spacewatch || — || align=right | 3.7 km || 
|-id=612 bgcolor=#d6d6d6
| 185612 ||  || — || February 6, 2008 || Catalina || CSS || — || align=right | 5.5 km || 
|-id=613 bgcolor=#d6d6d6
| 185613 ||  || — || February 6, 2008 || Catalina || CSS || — || align=right | 4.7 km || 
|-id=614 bgcolor=#d6d6d6
| 185614 ||  || — || February 7, 2008 || Mount Lemmon || Mount Lemmon Survey || — || align=right | 3.4 km || 
|-id=615 bgcolor=#E9E9E9
| 185615 ||  || — || February 8, 2008 || Catalina || CSS || EUN || align=right | 4.8 km || 
|-id=616 bgcolor=#E9E9E9
| 185616 ||  || — || February 9, 2008 || Catalina || CSS || — || align=right | 4.3 km || 
|-id=617 bgcolor=#fefefe
| 185617 ||  || — || February 7, 2008 || Mount Lemmon || Mount Lemmon Survey || NYS || align=right data-sort-value="0.96" | 960 m || 
|-id=618 bgcolor=#E9E9E9
| 185618 ||  || — || February 8, 2008 || Mount Lemmon || Mount Lemmon Survey || AGN || align=right | 1.3 km || 
|-id=619 bgcolor=#E9E9E9
| 185619 ||  || — || February 9, 2008 || Kitt Peak || Spacewatch || — || align=right | 3.0 km || 
|-id=620 bgcolor=#d6d6d6
| 185620 ||  || — || February 6, 2008 || Catalina || CSS || YAK || align=right | 5.5 km || 
|-id=621 bgcolor=#E9E9E9
| 185621 ||  || — || February 6, 2008 || Catalina || CSS || — || align=right | 3.4 km || 
|-id=622 bgcolor=#E9E9E9
| 185622 ||  || — || February 8, 2008 || Kitt Peak || Spacewatch || — || align=right | 1.9 km || 
|-id=623 bgcolor=#fefefe
| 185623 ||  || — || February 8, 2008 || Mount Lemmon || Mount Lemmon Survey || — || align=right data-sort-value="0.94" | 940 m || 
|-id=624 bgcolor=#d6d6d6
| 185624 ||  || — || February 10, 2008 || Catalina || CSS || — || align=right | 4.5 km || 
|-id=625 bgcolor=#d6d6d6
| 185625 ||  || — || February 11, 2008 || Mount Lemmon || Mount Lemmon Survey || — || align=right | 4.0 km || 
|-id=626 bgcolor=#E9E9E9
| 185626 ||  || — || February 6, 2008 || Socorro || LINEAR || EUN || align=right | 2.5 km || 
|-id=627 bgcolor=#d6d6d6
| 185627 ||  || — || February 6, 2008 || Catalina || CSS || — || align=right | 5.1 km || 
|-id=628 bgcolor=#E9E9E9
| 185628 ||  || — || February 6, 2008 || Catalina || CSS || DOR || align=right | 5.7 km || 
|-id=629 bgcolor=#E9E9E9
| 185629 ||  || — || February 9, 2008 || Catalina || CSS || JUN || align=right | 1.4 km || 
|-id=630 bgcolor=#fefefe
| 185630 ||  || — || February 9, 2008 || Catalina || CSS || — || align=right | 1.2 km || 
|-id=631 bgcolor=#fefefe
| 185631 ||  || — || February 11, 2008 || Mount Lemmon || Mount Lemmon Survey || V || align=right | 1.1 km || 
|-id=632 bgcolor=#d6d6d6
| 185632 ||  || — || February 13, 2008 || Catalina || CSS || — || align=right | 6.4 km || 
|-id=633 bgcolor=#fefefe
| 185633 Rainbach || 2008 DO ||  || February 24, 2008 || Gaisberg || R. Gierlinger || — || align=right | 1.1 km || 
|-id=634 bgcolor=#fefefe
| 185634 ||  || — || February 26, 2008 || Anderson Mesa || LONEOS || — || align=right | 1.1 km || 
|-id=635 bgcolor=#E9E9E9
| 185635 ||  || — || February 26, 2008 || Socorro || LINEAR || — || align=right | 3.0 km || 
|-id=636 bgcolor=#d6d6d6
| 185636 Shiao Lin ||  ||  || February 27, 2008 || Lulin Observatory || C.-S. Lin, Q.-z. Ye || EOS || align=right | 2.7 km || 
|-id=637 bgcolor=#d6d6d6
| 185637 ||  || — || February 27, 2008 || Catalina || CSS || — || align=right | 4.7 km || 
|-id=638 bgcolor=#fefefe
| 185638 Erwinschwab ||  ||  || March 1, 2008 || OAM || OAM Obs. || NYS || align=right data-sort-value="0.80" | 800 m || 
|-id=639 bgcolor=#fefefe
| 185639 Rainerkling ||  ||  || March 2, 2008 || OAM || OAM Obs. || — || align=right data-sort-value="0.87" | 870 m || 
|-id=640 bgcolor=#d6d6d6
| 185640 Sunyisui ||  ||  || March 1, 2008 || XuYi || PMO NEO || HIL3:2 || align=right | 8.2 km || 
|-id=641 bgcolor=#E9E9E9
| 185641 Judd ||  ||  || March 5, 2008 || Wrightwood || J. W. Young || — || align=right | 2.1 km || 
|-id=642 bgcolor=#E9E9E9
| 185642 ||  || — || March 8, 2008 || RAS || A. Lowe || — || align=right | 5.2 km || 
|-id=643 bgcolor=#FA8072
| 185643 || 2040 P-L || — || September 24, 1960 || Palomar || PLS || — || align=right | 1.3 km || 
|-id=644 bgcolor=#fefefe
| 185644 || 4890 P-L || — || September 24, 1960 || Palomar || PLS || NYS || align=right data-sort-value="0.69" | 690 m || 
|-id=645 bgcolor=#fefefe
| 185645 || 6733 P-L || — || September 24, 1960 || Palomar || PLS || — || align=right | 1.2 km || 
|-id=646 bgcolor=#d6d6d6
| 185646 || 3217 T-2 || — || September 30, 1973 || Palomar || PLS || — || align=right | 3.8 km || 
|-id=647 bgcolor=#fefefe
| 185647 || 4226 T-2 || — || September 29, 1973 || Palomar || PLS || NYS || align=right | 1.1 km || 
|-id=648 bgcolor=#d6d6d6
| 185648 || 1067 T-3 || — || October 17, 1977 || Palomar || PLS || — || align=right | 5.0 km || 
|-id=649 bgcolor=#d6d6d6
| 185649 || 1802 T-3 || — || October 17, 1977 || Palomar || PLS || EUP || align=right | 5.3 km || 
|-id=650 bgcolor=#fefefe
| 185650 || 2608 T-3 || — || October 16, 1977 || Palomar || PLS || — || align=right | 1.3 km || 
|-id=651 bgcolor=#fefefe
| 185651 || 3043 T-3 || — || October 16, 1977 || Palomar || PLS || NYS || align=right data-sort-value="0.77" | 770 m || 
|-id=652 bgcolor=#E9E9E9
| 185652 || 3199 T-3 || — || October 16, 1977 || Palomar || PLS || — || align=right | 3.7 km || 
|-id=653 bgcolor=#d6d6d6
| 185653 || 3442 T-3 || — || October 16, 1977 || Palomar || PLS || — || align=right | 4.1 km || 
|-id=654 bgcolor=#d6d6d6
| 185654 || 3980 T-3 || — || October 16, 1977 || Palomar || PLS || — || align=right | 3.9 km || 
|-id=655 bgcolor=#fefefe
| 185655 || 4368 T-3 || — || October 16, 1977 || Palomar || PLS || NYS || align=right data-sort-value="0.94" | 940 m || 
|-id=656 bgcolor=#d6d6d6
| 185656 ||  || — || March 2, 1981 || Siding Spring || S. J. Bus || EOS || align=right | 3.1 km || 
|-id=657 bgcolor=#E9E9E9
| 185657 ||  || — || November 19, 1992 || Kitt Peak || Spacewatch || MAR || align=right | 1.8 km || 
|-id=658 bgcolor=#fefefe
| 185658 ||  || — || March 24, 1993 || Kitt Peak || Spacewatch || NYS || align=right data-sort-value="0.71" | 710 m || 
|-id=659 bgcolor=#d6d6d6
| 185659 ||  || — || March 19, 1993 || La Silla || UESAC || SAN || align=right | 2.5 km || 
|-id=660 bgcolor=#d6d6d6
| 185660 ||  || — || September 15, 1993 || La Silla || E. W. Elst || HYG || align=right | 4.3 km || 
|-id=661 bgcolor=#E9E9E9
| 185661 ||  || — || October 9, 1993 || La Silla || E. W. Elst || — || align=right | 1.5 km || 
|-id=662 bgcolor=#E9E9E9
| 185662 ||  || — || January 11, 1994 || Kitt Peak || Spacewatch || — || align=right | 4.1 km || 
|-id=663 bgcolor=#fefefe
| 185663 || 1994 EE || — || March 4, 1994 || Stroncone || A. Vagnozzi || FLO || align=right data-sort-value="0.92" | 920 m || 
|-id=664 bgcolor=#E9E9E9
| 185664 ||  || — || January 7, 1995 || Kitt Peak || Spacewatch || — || align=right | 1.3 km || 
|-id=665 bgcolor=#E9E9E9
| 185665 ||  || — || February 1, 1995 || Kitt Peak || Spacewatch || — || align=right | 2.0 km || 
|-id=666 bgcolor=#C2FFFF
| 185666 ||  || — || March 26, 1995 || Kitt Peak || Spacewatch || L5 || align=right | 14 km || 
|-id=667 bgcolor=#E9E9E9
| 185667 ||  || — || March 27, 1995 || Kitt Peak || Spacewatch || — || align=right | 2.3 km || 
|-id=668 bgcolor=#fefefe
| 185668 ||  || — || June 29, 1995 || Kitt Peak || Spacewatch || FLO || align=right data-sort-value="0.70" | 700 m || 
|-id=669 bgcolor=#E9E9E9
| 185669 ||  || — || June 28, 1995 || Kitt Peak || Spacewatch || — || align=right | 3.2 km || 
|-id=670 bgcolor=#fefefe
| 185670 || 1995 RS || — || September 14, 1995 || Haleakala || AMOS || FLO || align=right data-sort-value="0.89" | 890 m || 
|-id=671 bgcolor=#fefefe
| 185671 ||  || — || September 18, 1995 || Kitt Peak || Spacewatch || MAS || align=right | 1.00 km || 
|-id=672 bgcolor=#d6d6d6
| 185672 ||  || — || September 19, 1995 || Kitt Peak || Spacewatch || KOR || align=right | 1.8 km || 
|-id=673 bgcolor=#fefefe
| 185673 ||  || — || September 21, 1995 || Kitt Peak || Spacewatch || — || align=right data-sort-value="0.72" | 720 m || 
|-id=674 bgcolor=#fefefe
| 185674 ||  || — || September 20, 1995 || Kitt Peak || Spacewatch || — || align=right | 1.8 km || 
|-id=675 bgcolor=#d6d6d6
| 185675 ||  || — || September 21, 1995 || Kitt Peak || Spacewatch || KAR || align=right | 1.4 km || 
|-id=676 bgcolor=#fefefe
| 185676 ||  || — || September 26, 1995 || Kitt Peak || Spacewatch || MAS || align=right data-sort-value="0.70" | 700 m || 
|-id=677 bgcolor=#d6d6d6
| 185677 ||  || — || September 18, 1995 || Kitt Peak || Spacewatch || KOR || align=right | 1.4 km || 
|-id=678 bgcolor=#fefefe
| 185678 ||  || — || October 14, 1995 || Xinglong || SCAP || — || align=right | 1.4 km || 
|-id=679 bgcolor=#d6d6d6
| 185679 ||  || — || October 21, 1995 || Kitt Peak || Spacewatch || — || align=right | 2.9 km || 
|-id=680 bgcolor=#fefefe
| 185680 ||  || — || December 16, 1995 || Kitt Peak || Spacewatch || PHO || align=right | 2.8 km || 
|-id=681 bgcolor=#d6d6d6
| 185681 ||  || — || January 15, 1996 || Kitt Peak || Spacewatch || — || align=right | 4.2 km || 
|-id=682 bgcolor=#E9E9E9
| 185682 ||  || — || May 11, 1996 || Kitt Peak || Spacewatch || — || align=right | 1.1 km || 
|-id=683 bgcolor=#E9E9E9
| 185683 ||  || — || June 16, 1996 || Kitt Peak || Spacewatch || — || align=right | 1.6 km || 
|-id=684 bgcolor=#E9E9E9
| 185684 ||  || — || September 5, 1996 || Kitt Peak || Spacewatch || — || align=right | 3.6 km || 
|-id=685 bgcolor=#E9E9E9
| 185685 ||  || — || October 7, 1996 || Kitt Peak || Spacewatch || AGN || align=right | 1.6 km || 
|-id=686 bgcolor=#E9E9E9
| 185686 ||  || — || November 6, 1996 || Kitt Peak || Spacewatch || — || align=right | 3.4 km || 
|-id=687 bgcolor=#fefefe
| 185687 ||  || — || December 4, 1996 || Kitt Peak || Spacewatch || — || align=right | 1.2 km || 
|-id=688 bgcolor=#d6d6d6
| 185688 ||  || — || February 6, 1997 || Sormano || M. Cavagna, A. Testa || — || align=right | 3.0 km || 
|-id=689 bgcolor=#d6d6d6
| 185689 ||  || — || April 2, 1997 || Socorro || LINEAR || EUP || align=right | 7.1 km || 
|-id=690 bgcolor=#fefefe
| 185690 ||  || — || April 3, 1997 || Socorro || LINEAR || — || align=right | 1.3 km || 
|-id=691 bgcolor=#fefefe
| 185691 ||  || — || April 3, 1997 || Socorro || LINEAR || NYS || align=right data-sort-value="0.86" | 860 m || 
|-id=692 bgcolor=#fefefe
| 185692 ||  || — || April 15, 1997 || Kitt Peak || Spacewatch || H || align=right data-sort-value="0.94" | 940 m || 
|-id=693 bgcolor=#C2FFFF
| 185693 ||  || — || April 30, 1997 || Kitt Peak || Spacewatch || L5 || align=right | 15 km || 
|-id=694 bgcolor=#E9E9E9
| 185694 ||  || — || October 7, 1997 || Kitt Peak || Spacewatch || — || align=right | 1.9 km || 
|-id=695 bgcolor=#E9E9E9
| 185695 ||  || — || October 23, 1997 || Kitt Peak || Spacewatch || HEN || align=right | 1.2 km || 
|-id=696 bgcolor=#E9E9E9
| 185696 ||  || — || November 20, 1997 || Kitt Peak || Spacewatch || ADE || align=right | 3.5 km || 
|-id=697 bgcolor=#E9E9E9
| 185697 ||  || — || November 21, 1997 || Kitt Peak || Spacewatch || VIB || align=right | 2.6 km || 
|-id=698 bgcolor=#E9E9E9
| 185698 ||  || — || January 23, 1998 || Kitt Peak || Spacewatch || HEN || align=right | 1.3 km || 
|-id=699 bgcolor=#E9E9E9
| 185699 ||  || — || January 29, 1998 || Kitt Peak || Spacewatch || HEN || align=right | 1.3 km || 
|-id=700 bgcolor=#E9E9E9
| 185700 ||  || — || February 17, 1998 || Kitt Peak || Spacewatch || WIT || align=right | 1.5 km || 
|}

185701–185800 

|-bgcolor=#fefefe
| 185701 ||  || — || March 29, 1998 || Caussols || ODAS || — || align=right | 1.3 km || 
|-id=702 bgcolor=#FFC2E0
| 185702 ||  || — || April 20, 1998 || Socorro || LINEAR || AMO +1km || align=right data-sort-value="0.93" | 930 m || 
|-id=703 bgcolor=#d6d6d6
| 185703 || 1998 KW || — || May 20, 1998 || Caussols || ODAS || — || align=right | 4.7 km || 
|-id=704 bgcolor=#fefefe
| 185704 ||  || — || July 26, 1998 || La Silla || E. W. Elst || — || align=right | 3.4 km || 
|-id=705 bgcolor=#fefefe
| 185705 ||  || — || August 17, 1998 || Socorro || LINEAR || — || align=right | 1.4 km || 
|-id=706 bgcolor=#fefefe
| 185706 ||  || — || August 24, 1998 || Socorro || LINEAR || — || align=right | 1.7 km || 
|-id=707 bgcolor=#fefefe
| 185707 ||  || — || August 24, 1998 || Socorro || LINEAR || — || align=right | 1.4 km || 
|-id=708 bgcolor=#d6d6d6
| 185708 ||  || — || August 19, 1998 || Socorro || LINEAR || EUP || align=right | 6.1 km || 
|-id=709 bgcolor=#d6d6d6
| 185709 ||  || — || September 14, 1998 || Kitt Peak || Spacewatch || — || align=right | 5.8 km || 
|-id=710 bgcolor=#fefefe
| 185710 ||  || — || September 14, 1998 || Socorro || LINEAR || FLO || align=right | 1.1 km || 
|-id=711 bgcolor=#fefefe
| 185711 ||  || — || September 14, 1998 || Socorro || LINEAR || NYS || align=right | 1.0 km || 
|-id=712 bgcolor=#fefefe
| 185712 ||  || — || September 14, 1998 || Socorro || LINEAR || NYS || align=right | 1.4 km || 
|-id=713 bgcolor=#fefefe
| 185713 ||  || — || September 17, 1998 || Caussols || ODAS || — || align=right | 1.3 km || 
|-id=714 bgcolor=#d6d6d6
| 185714 ||  || — || September 26, 1998 || Socorro || LINEAR || Tj (2.99) || align=right | 6.3 km || 
|-id=715 bgcolor=#fefefe
| 185715 ||  || — || September 17, 1998 || Caussols || ODAS || — || align=right | 1.3 km || 
|-id=716 bgcolor=#FFC2E0
| 185716 ||  || — || September 24, 1998 || Socorro || LINEAR || AMO +1km || align=right data-sort-value="0.63" | 630 m || 
|-id=717 bgcolor=#fefefe
| 185717 ||  || — || September 28, 1998 || Kitt Peak || Spacewatch || — || align=right | 1.1 km || 
|-id=718 bgcolor=#fefefe
| 185718 ||  || — || September 20, 1998 || La Silla || E. W. Elst || NYS || align=right | 1.2 km || 
|-id=719 bgcolor=#fefefe
| 185719 ||  || — || September 26, 1998 || Socorro || LINEAR || — || align=right | 2.6 km || 
|-id=720 bgcolor=#fefefe
| 185720 ||  || — || September 26, 1998 || Socorro || LINEAR || NYS || align=right data-sort-value="0.87" | 870 m || 
|-id=721 bgcolor=#fefefe
| 185721 ||  || — || September 26, 1998 || Socorro || LINEAR || V || align=right | 1.2 km || 
|-id=722 bgcolor=#fefefe
| 185722 ||  || — || September 26, 1998 || Socorro || LINEAR || — || align=right | 1.2 km || 
|-id=723 bgcolor=#fefefe
| 185723 ||  || — || September 26, 1998 || Socorro || LINEAR || NYS || align=right | 1.1 km || 
|-id=724 bgcolor=#fefefe
| 185724 ||  || — || September 26, 1998 || Socorro || LINEAR || — || align=right | 1.4 km || 
|-id=725 bgcolor=#fefefe
| 185725 ||  || — || September 26, 1998 || Socorro || LINEAR || NYS || align=right data-sort-value="0.92" | 920 m || 
|-id=726 bgcolor=#FA8072
| 185726 ||  || — || September 26, 1998 || Socorro || LINEAR || — || align=right | 1.2 km || 
|-id=727 bgcolor=#fefefe
| 185727 ||  || — || September 26, 1998 || Socorro || LINEAR || — || align=right | 1.3 km || 
|-id=728 bgcolor=#fefefe
| 185728 ||  || — || October 20, 1998 || Caussols || ODAS || — || align=right | 1.2 km || 
|-id=729 bgcolor=#fefefe
| 185729 ||  || — || October 18, 1998 || La Silla || E. W. Elst || — || align=right | 1.2 km || 
|-id=730 bgcolor=#fefefe
| 185730 ||  || — || October 28, 1998 || Socorro || LINEAR || — || align=right | 1.1 km || 
|-id=731 bgcolor=#FA8072
| 185731 ||  || — || November 8, 1998 || Gekko || T. Kagawa || — || align=right | 1.5 km || 
|-id=732 bgcolor=#fefefe
| 185732 ||  || — || November 21, 1998 || Socorro || LINEAR || — || align=right | 1.4 km || 
|-id=733 bgcolor=#E9E9E9
| 185733 Luigicolzani ||  ||  || November 28, 1998 || Sormano || M. Cavagna, A. Testa || — || align=right | 2.7 km || 
|-id=734 bgcolor=#FA8072
| 185734 ||  || — || November 19, 1998 || Anderson Mesa || LONEOS || — || align=right | 1.6 km || 
|-id=735 bgcolor=#fefefe
| 185735 ||  || — || December 7, 1998 || Caussols || ODAS || V || align=right | 1.1 km || 
|-id=736 bgcolor=#fefefe
| 185736 ||  || — || December 14, 1998 || Socorro || LINEAR || PHO || align=right | 2.0 km || 
|-id=737 bgcolor=#E9E9E9
| 185737 ||  || — || December 22, 1998 || Kitt Peak || Spacewatch || — || align=right | 1.9 km || 
|-id=738 bgcolor=#E9E9E9
| 185738 ||  || — || February 12, 1999 || Socorro || LINEAR || — || align=right | 3.1 km || 
|-id=739 bgcolor=#E9E9E9
| 185739 ||  || — || February 12, 1999 || Socorro || LINEAR || — || align=right | 4.3 km || 
|-id=740 bgcolor=#E9E9E9
| 185740 ||  || — || February 12, 1999 || Socorro || LINEAR || — || align=right | 2.5 km || 
|-id=741 bgcolor=#E9E9E9
| 185741 ||  || — || February 8, 1999 || Kitt Peak || Spacewatch || — || align=right | 2.0 km || 
|-id=742 bgcolor=#E9E9E9
| 185742 ||  || — || March 9, 1999 || Kitt Peak || Spacewatch || MIS || align=right | 2.9 km || 
|-id=743 bgcolor=#E9E9E9
| 185743 ||  || — || March 20, 1999 || Apache Point || SDSS || — || align=right | 2.5 km || 
|-id=744 bgcolor=#d6d6d6
| 185744 Hogan ||  ||  || March 21, 1999 || Apache Point || SDSS || — || align=right | 3.9 km || 
|-id=745 bgcolor=#E9E9E9
| 185745 ||  || — || April 16, 1999 || Catalina || CSS || — || align=right | 2.9 km || 
|-id=746 bgcolor=#FA8072
| 185746 ||  || — || June 7, 1999 || Kitt Peak || Spacewatch || — || align=right | 1.0 km || 
|-id=747 bgcolor=#E9E9E9
| 185747 ||  || — || June 10, 1999 || Kitt Peak || Spacewatch || — || align=right | 2.5 km || 
|-id=748 bgcolor=#d6d6d6
| 185748 ||  || — || July 15, 1999 || Gnosca || S. Sposetti || — || align=right | 4.9 km || 
|-id=749 bgcolor=#d6d6d6
| 185749 ||  || — || September 7, 1999 || Socorro || LINEAR || — || align=right | 3.9 km || 
|-id=750 bgcolor=#d6d6d6
| 185750 ||  || — || September 7, 1999 || Socorro || LINEAR || — || align=right | 3.4 km || 
|-id=751 bgcolor=#fefefe
| 185751 ||  || — || September 8, 1999 || Socorro || LINEAR || — || align=right | 1.4 km || 
|-id=752 bgcolor=#fefefe
| 185752 ||  || — || September 9, 1999 || Socorro || LINEAR || — || align=right | 1.4 km || 
|-id=753 bgcolor=#fefefe
| 185753 ||  || — || September 13, 1999 || Eskridge || G. Hug, G. Bell || — || align=right | 1.1 km || 
|-id=754 bgcolor=#d6d6d6
| 185754 ||  || — || September 8, 1999 || Catalina || CSS || EOS || align=right | 3.5 km || 
|-id=755 bgcolor=#d6d6d6
| 185755 || 1999 SV || — || September 16, 1999 || Kitt Peak || Spacewatch || THM || align=right | 2.9 km || 
|-id=756 bgcolor=#fefefe
| 185756 ||  || — || October 7, 1999 || Višnjan Observatory || K. Korlević, M. Jurić || — || align=right | 1.5 km || 
|-id=757 bgcolor=#d6d6d6
| 185757 ||  || — || October 12, 1999 || Ondřejov || P. Pravec, P. Kušnirák || — || align=right | 3.8 km || 
|-id=758 bgcolor=#d6d6d6
| 185758 ||  || — || October 10, 1999 || Xinglong || SCAP || — || align=right | 4.6 km || 
|-id=759 bgcolor=#d6d6d6
| 185759 ||  || — || October 3, 1999 || Kitt Peak || Spacewatch || — || align=right | 4.4 km || 
|-id=760 bgcolor=#fefefe
| 185760 ||  || — || October 7, 1999 || Kitt Peak || Spacewatch || — || align=right | 1.3 km || 
|-id=761 bgcolor=#d6d6d6
| 185761 ||  || — || October 10, 1999 || Kitt Peak || Spacewatch || — || align=right | 4.7 km || 
|-id=762 bgcolor=#d6d6d6
| 185762 ||  || — || October 11, 1999 || Kitt Peak || Spacewatch || HYG || align=right | 3.2 km || 
|-id=763 bgcolor=#d6d6d6
| 185763 ||  || — || October 12, 1999 || Kitt Peak || Spacewatch || — || align=right | 2.9 km || 
|-id=764 bgcolor=#d6d6d6
| 185764 ||  || — || October 2, 1999 || Socorro || LINEAR || — || align=right | 6.0 km || 
|-id=765 bgcolor=#d6d6d6
| 185765 ||  || — || October 4, 1999 || Socorro || LINEAR || — || align=right | 4.1 km || 
|-id=766 bgcolor=#d6d6d6
| 185766 ||  || — || October 4, 1999 || Socorro || LINEAR || — || align=right | 5.0 km || 
|-id=767 bgcolor=#d6d6d6
| 185767 ||  || — || October 6, 1999 || Socorro || LINEAR || HYG || align=right | 3.5 km || 
|-id=768 bgcolor=#fefefe
| 185768 ||  || — || October 6, 1999 || Socorro || LINEAR || FLO || align=right | 1.1 km || 
|-id=769 bgcolor=#d6d6d6
| 185769 ||  || — || October 9, 1999 || Socorro || LINEAR || — || align=right | 6.1 km || 
|-id=770 bgcolor=#fefefe
| 185770 ||  || — || October 10, 1999 || Socorro || LINEAR || FLO || align=right data-sort-value="0.79" | 790 m || 
|-id=771 bgcolor=#fefefe
| 185771 ||  || — || October 10, 1999 || Socorro || LINEAR || — || align=right | 1.2 km || 
|-id=772 bgcolor=#fefefe
| 185772 ||  || — || October 10, 1999 || Socorro || LINEAR || — || align=right | 1.1 km || 
|-id=773 bgcolor=#d6d6d6
| 185773 ||  || — || October 5, 1999 || Catalina || CSS || — || align=right | 4.9 km || 
|-id=774 bgcolor=#fefefe
| 185774 ||  || — || October 3, 1999 || Catalina || CSS || FLO || align=right | 1.0 km || 
|-id=775 bgcolor=#d6d6d6
| 185775 ||  || — || October 4, 1999 || Catalina || CSS || — || align=right | 2.6 km || 
|-id=776 bgcolor=#d6d6d6
| 185776 ||  || — || October 3, 1999 || Socorro || LINEAR || TEL || align=right | 2.6 km || 
|-id=777 bgcolor=#fefefe
| 185777 ||  || — || October 10, 1999 || Socorro || LINEAR || — || align=right | 1.4 km || 
|-id=778 bgcolor=#d6d6d6
| 185778 ||  || — || October 10, 1999 || Socorro || LINEAR || HYG || align=right | 5.1 km || 
|-id=779 bgcolor=#fefefe
| 185779 ||  || — || October 31, 1999 || Kitt Peak || Spacewatch || — || align=right data-sort-value="0.89" | 890 m || 
|-id=780 bgcolor=#d6d6d6
| 185780 ||  || — || October 31, 1999 || Kitt Peak || Spacewatch || — || align=right | 4.2 km || 
|-id=781 bgcolor=#d6d6d6
| 185781 ||  || — || October 16, 1999 || Kitt Peak || Spacewatch || — || align=right | 3.1 km || 
|-id=782 bgcolor=#d6d6d6
| 185782 ||  || — || October 28, 1999 || Catalina || CSS || — || align=right | 5.8 km || 
|-id=783 bgcolor=#fefefe
| 185783 ||  || — || October 30, 1999 || Kitt Peak || Spacewatch || — || align=right | 1.0 km || 
|-id=784 bgcolor=#d6d6d6
| 185784 ||  || — || October 19, 1999 || Kitt Peak || Spacewatch || — || align=right | 4.0 km || 
|-id=785 bgcolor=#d6d6d6
| 185785 ||  || — || November 2, 1999 || Kitt Peak || Spacewatch || — || align=right | 4.2 km || 
|-id=786 bgcolor=#fefefe
| 185786 ||  || — || November 13, 1999 || Oizumi || T. Kobayashi || PHO || align=right | 1.9 km || 
|-id=787 bgcolor=#d6d6d6
| 185787 ||  || — || November 3, 1999 || Socorro || LINEAR || — || align=right | 5.9 km || 
|-id=788 bgcolor=#fefefe
| 185788 ||  || — || November 4, 1999 || Socorro || LINEAR || — || align=right | 1.2 km || 
|-id=789 bgcolor=#d6d6d6
| 185789 ||  || — || November 4, 1999 || Socorro || LINEAR || HYG || align=right | 4.9 km || 
|-id=790 bgcolor=#fefefe
| 185790 ||  || — || November 4, 1999 || Socorro || LINEAR || — || align=right | 1.1 km || 
|-id=791 bgcolor=#fefefe
| 185791 ||  || — || November 9, 1999 || Socorro || LINEAR || — || align=right data-sort-value="0.94" | 940 m || 
|-id=792 bgcolor=#fefefe
| 185792 ||  || — || November 9, 1999 || Socorro || LINEAR || NYS || align=right data-sort-value="0.95" | 950 m || 
|-id=793 bgcolor=#d6d6d6
| 185793 ||  || — || November 9, 1999 || Kitt Peak || Spacewatch || — || align=right | 3.9 km || 
|-id=794 bgcolor=#d6d6d6
| 185794 ||  || — || November 9, 1999 || Kitt Peak || Spacewatch || — || align=right | 3.1 km || 
|-id=795 bgcolor=#fefefe
| 185795 ||  || — || November 14, 1999 || Socorro || LINEAR || FLO || align=right data-sort-value="0.77" | 770 m || 
|-id=796 bgcolor=#d6d6d6
| 185796 ||  || — || November 14, 1999 || Socorro || LINEAR || — || align=right | 5.2 km || 
|-id=797 bgcolor=#d6d6d6
| 185797 ||  || — || November 10, 1999 || Kitt Peak || Spacewatch || — || align=right | 4.5 km || 
|-id=798 bgcolor=#fefefe
| 185798 ||  || — || November 9, 1999 || Socorro || LINEAR || NYS || align=right data-sort-value="0.98" | 980 m || 
|-id=799 bgcolor=#fefefe
| 185799 ||  || — || November 9, 1999 || Socorro || LINEAR || — || align=right | 1.4 km || 
|-id=800 bgcolor=#d6d6d6
| 185800 ||  || — || November 14, 1999 || Socorro || LINEAR || — || align=right | 5.6 km || 
|}

185801–185900 

|-bgcolor=#fefefe
| 185801 ||  || — || November 14, 1999 || Socorro || LINEAR || — || align=right | 1.3 km || 
|-id=802 bgcolor=#d6d6d6
| 185802 ||  || — || November 14, 1999 || Socorro || LINEAR || — || align=right | 4.9 km || 
|-id=803 bgcolor=#d6d6d6
| 185803 ||  || — || November 4, 1999 || Kitt Peak || Spacewatch || — || align=right | 5.7 km || 
|-id=804 bgcolor=#fefefe
| 185804 ||  || — || November 11, 1999 || Kitt Peak || Spacewatch || — || align=right | 1.1 km || 
|-id=805 bgcolor=#fefefe
| 185805 ||  || — || November 3, 1999 || Catalina || CSS || — || align=right | 1.0 km || 
|-id=806 bgcolor=#d6d6d6
| 185806 ||  || — || November 2, 1999 || Catalina || CSS || — || align=right | 4.7 km || 
|-id=807 bgcolor=#fefefe
| 185807 ||  || — || November 9, 1999 || Catalina || CSS || — || align=right | 1.1 km || 
|-id=808 bgcolor=#d6d6d6
| 185808 ||  || — || November 12, 1999 || Socorro || LINEAR || — || align=right | 3.4 km || 
|-id=809 bgcolor=#d6d6d6
| 185809 ||  || — || November 3, 1999 || Kitt Peak || Spacewatch || 7:4 || align=right | 4.2 km || 
|-id=810 bgcolor=#d6d6d6
| 185810 ||  || — || November 3, 1999 || Kitt Peak || Spacewatch || — || align=right | 4.2 km || 
|-id=811 bgcolor=#fefefe
| 185811 ||  || — || November 9, 1999 || Catalina || CSS || — || align=right | 1.2 km || 
|-id=812 bgcolor=#d6d6d6
| 185812 ||  || — || December 4, 1999 || Catalina || CSS || HYG || align=right | 4.2 km || 
|-id=813 bgcolor=#fefefe
| 185813 ||  || — || December 7, 1999 || Socorro || LINEAR || NYS || align=right data-sort-value="0.95" | 950 m || 
|-id=814 bgcolor=#fefefe
| 185814 ||  || — || December 7, 1999 || Socorro || LINEAR || — || align=right | 1.6 km || 
|-id=815 bgcolor=#d6d6d6
| 185815 ||  || — || December 2, 1999 || Kitt Peak || Spacewatch || — || align=right | 5.0 km || 
|-id=816 bgcolor=#d6d6d6
| 185816 ||  || — || December 7, 1999 || Kitt Peak || Spacewatch || HYG || align=right | 4.0 km || 
|-id=817 bgcolor=#E9E9E9
| 185817 ||  || — || December 12, 1999 || Socorro || LINEAR || — || align=right | 2.6 km || 
|-id=818 bgcolor=#fefefe
| 185818 ||  || — || December 13, 1999 || Kitt Peak || Spacewatch || MAS || align=right data-sort-value="0.83" | 830 m || 
|-id=819 bgcolor=#fefefe
| 185819 ||  || — || December 15, 1999 || Socorro || LINEAR || — || align=right | 1.3 km || 
|-id=820 bgcolor=#fefefe
| 185820 ||  || — || December 5, 1999 || Kitt Peak || Spacewatch || MAS || align=right | 1.0 km || 
|-id=821 bgcolor=#d6d6d6
| 185821 ||  || — || December 31, 1999 || Kitt Peak || Spacewatch || — || align=right | 3.8 km || 
|-id=822 bgcolor=#fefefe
| 185822 ||  || — || January 3, 2000 || EverStaR || Everstar Obs. || — || align=right | 1.4 km || 
|-id=823 bgcolor=#fefefe
| 185823 ||  || — || January 3, 2000 || Socorro || LINEAR || NYS || align=right | 1.1 km || 
|-id=824 bgcolor=#fefefe
| 185824 ||  || — || January 3, 2000 || Socorro || LINEAR || — || align=right | 1.3 km || 
|-id=825 bgcolor=#fefefe
| 185825 ||  || — || January 5, 2000 || Socorro || LINEAR || — || align=right | 1.1 km || 
|-id=826 bgcolor=#fefefe
| 185826 ||  || — || January 5, 2000 || Socorro || LINEAR || — || align=right | 1.5 km || 
|-id=827 bgcolor=#fefefe
| 185827 ||  || — || January 4, 2000 || Socorro || LINEAR || — || align=right | 1.1 km || 
|-id=828 bgcolor=#d6d6d6
| 185828 ||  || — || January 2, 2000 || Socorro || LINEAR || — || align=right | 5.9 km || 
|-id=829 bgcolor=#fefefe
| 185829 ||  || — || January 7, 2000 || Socorro || LINEAR || FLO || align=right | 1.0 km || 
|-id=830 bgcolor=#fefefe
| 185830 ||  || — || January 7, 2000 || Socorro || LINEAR || — || align=right | 1.6 km || 
|-id=831 bgcolor=#fefefe
| 185831 ||  || — || January 8, 2000 || Kitt Peak || Spacewatch || V || align=right | 1.0 km || 
|-id=832 bgcolor=#fefefe
| 185832 ||  || — || January 8, 2000 || Kitt Peak || Spacewatch || NYS || align=right data-sort-value="0.87" | 870 m || 
|-id=833 bgcolor=#fefefe
| 185833 ||  || — || January 8, 2000 || Kitt Peak || Spacewatch || NYS || align=right data-sort-value="0.92" | 920 m || 
|-id=834 bgcolor=#fefefe
| 185834 ||  || — || January 28, 2000 || Kitt Peak || Spacewatch || NYS || align=right data-sort-value="0.86" | 860 m || 
|-id=835 bgcolor=#fefefe
| 185835 ||  || — || January 30, 2000 || Socorro || LINEAR || — || align=right | 1.4 km || 
|-id=836 bgcolor=#fefefe
| 185836 ||  || — || January 30, 2000 || Socorro || LINEAR || — || align=right | 1.3 km || 
|-id=837 bgcolor=#fefefe
| 185837 ||  || — || January 26, 2000 || Kitt Peak || Spacewatch || MAS || align=right data-sort-value="0.81" | 810 m || 
|-id=838 bgcolor=#fefefe
| 185838 ||  || — || February 2, 2000 || Socorro || LINEAR || V || align=right | 1.1 km || 
|-id=839 bgcolor=#fefefe
| 185839 ||  || — || February 1, 2000 || Kitt Peak || Spacewatch || — || align=right | 1.0 km || 
|-id=840 bgcolor=#fefefe
| 185840 ||  || — || February 8, 2000 || Socorro || LINEAR || — || align=right | 1.9 km || 
|-id=841 bgcolor=#E9E9E9
| 185841 ||  || — || February 4, 2000 || Socorro || LINEAR || MIT || align=right | 3.4 km || 
|-id=842 bgcolor=#fefefe
| 185842 ||  || — || February 7, 2000 || Kitt Peak || Spacewatch || MAS || align=right data-sort-value="0.88" | 880 m || 
|-id=843 bgcolor=#fefefe
| 185843 ||  || — || February 12, 2000 || Kitt Peak || Spacewatch || NYS || align=right | 1.0 km || 
|-id=844 bgcolor=#fefefe
| 185844 ||  || — || February 3, 2000 || Kitt Peak || Spacewatch || NYS || align=right data-sort-value="0.90" | 900 m || 
|-id=845 bgcolor=#fefefe
| 185845 ||  || — || February 28, 2000 || Socorro || LINEAR || — || align=right | 1.5 km || 
|-id=846 bgcolor=#fefefe
| 185846 ||  || — || February 29, 2000 || Socorro || LINEAR || — || align=right | 2.4 km || 
|-id=847 bgcolor=#fefefe
| 185847 ||  || — || February 29, 2000 || Socorro || LINEAR || — || align=right | 1.4 km || 
|-id=848 bgcolor=#fefefe
| 185848 ||  || — || February 29, 2000 || Socorro || LINEAR || NYS || align=right data-sort-value="0.90" | 900 m || 
|-id=849 bgcolor=#fefefe
| 185849 ||  || — || February 29, 2000 || Socorro || LINEAR || V || align=right data-sort-value="0.99" | 990 m || 
|-id=850 bgcolor=#fefefe
| 185850 ||  || — || February 29, 2000 || Socorro || LINEAR || V || align=right | 1.1 km || 
|-id=851 bgcolor=#FFC2E0
| 185851 ||  || — || February 29, 2000 || Socorro || LINEAR || APO +1kmPHAmoon || align=right data-sort-value="0.86" | 860 m || 
|-id=852 bgcolor=#fefefe
| 185852 ||  || — || March 3, 2000 || Socorro || LINEAR || V || align=right | 1.1 km || 
|-id=853 bgcolor=#FFC2E0
| 185853 ||  || — || March 4, 2000 || Socorro || LINEAR || AMO +1km || align=right | 1.5 km || 
|-id=854 bgcolor=#FA8072
| 185854 ||  || — || March 9, 2000 || Socorro || LINEAR || — || align=right | 1.9 km || 
|-id=855 bgcolor=#fefefe
| 185855 ||  || — || March 10, 2000 || Kitt Peak || Spacewatch || NYS || align=right | 1.0 km || 
|-id=856 bgcolor=#E9E9E9
| 185856 ||  || — || March 11, 2000 || Anderson Mesa || LONEOS || MAR || align=right | 2.0 km || 
|-id=857 bgcolor=#E9E9E9
| 185857 ||  || — || March 4, 2000 || Socorro || LINEAR || — || align=right | 1.6 km || 
|-id=858 bgcolor=#fefefe
| 185858 || 2000 GB || — || April 1, 2000 || Kitt Peak || Spacewatch || — || align=right | 1.3 km || 
|-id=859 bgcolor=#fefefe
| 185859 ||  || — || April 5, 2000 || Socorro || LINEAR || V || align=right | 1.3 km || 
|-id=860 bgcolor=#E9E9E9
| 185860 ||  || — || April 5, 2000 || Socorro || LINEAR || — || align=right | 1.5 km || 
|-id=861 bgcolor=#d6d6d6
| 185861 ||  || — || April 5, 2000 || Socorro || LINEAR || 3:2 || align=right | 6.7 km || 
|-id=862 bgcolor=#fefefe
| 185862 ||  || — || April 10, 2000 || Haleakala || NEAT || — || align=right | 1.8 km || 
|-id=863 bgcolor=#fefefe
| 185863 ||  || — || April 2, 2000 || Anderson Mesa || LONEOS || H || align=right data-sort-value="0.72" | 720 m || 
|-id=864 bgcolor=#E9E9E9
| 185864 ||  || — || April 27, 2000 || Socorro || LINEAR || — || align=right | 1.5 km || 
|-id=865 bgcolor=#E9E9E9
| 185865 ||  || — || April 29, 2000 || Kitt Peak || Spacewatch || — || align=right | 1.7 km || 
|-id=866 bgcolor=#E9E9E9
| 185866 ||  || — || April 29, 2000 || Anderson Mesa || LONEOS || EUN || align=right | 2.4 km || 
|-id=867 bgcolor=#fefefe
| 185867 ||  || — || April 28, 2000 || Kitt Peak || Spacewatch || — || align=right | 1.5 km || 
|-id=868 bgcolor=#fefefe
| 185868 ||  || — || May 3, 2000 || Socorro || LINEAR || H || align=right data-sort-value="0.93" | 930 m || 
|-id=869 bgcolor=#E9E9E9
| 185869 ||  || — || May 5, 2000 || Kitt Peak || Spacewatch || — || align=right | 1.6 km || 
|-id=870 bgcolor=#fefefe
| 185870 ||  || — || May 7, 2000 || Socorro || LINEAR || H || align=right data-sort-value="0.73" | 730 m || 
|-id=871 bgcolor=#E9E9E9
| 185871 ||  || — || May 7, 2000 || Socorro || LINEAR || — || align=right | 2.8 km || 
|-id=872 bgcolor=#E9E9E9
| 185872 || 2000 KZ || — || May 24, 2000 || Kitt Peak || Spacewatch || — || align=right | 1.1 km || 
|-id=873 bgcolor=#fefefe
| 185873 ||  || — || May 26, 2000 || Socorro || LINEAR || H || align=right | 1.1 km || 
|-id=874 bgcolor=#fefefe
| 185874 ||  || — || May 27, 2000 || Socorro || LINEAR || H || align=right | 1.3 km || 
|-id=875 bgcolor=#fefefe
| 185875 ||  || — || June 7, 2000 || Socorro || LINEAR || — || align=right | 4.2 km || 
|-id=876 bgcolor=#E9E9E9
| 185876 ||  || — || July 5, 2000 || Anderson Mesa || LONEOS || — || align=right | 1.7 km || 
|-id=877 bgcolor=#E9E9E9
| 185877 ||  || — || July 30, 2000 || Socorro || LINEAR || JUNfast? || align=right | 2.9 km || 
|-id=878 bgcolor=#E9E9E9
| 185878 ||  || — || July 30, 2000 || Socorro || LINEAR || — || align=right | 5.0 km || 
|-id=879 bgcolor=#E9E9E9
| 185879 ||  || — || July 30, 2000 || Socorro || LINEAR || JUN || align=right | 2.0 km || 
|-id=880 bgcolor=#E9E9E9
| 185880 ||  || — || July 30, 2000 || Socorro || LINEAR || — || align=right | 3.1 km || 
|-id=881 bgcolor=#E9E9E9
| 185881 ||  || — || July 30, 2000 || Socorro || LINEAR || — || align=right | 3.0 km || 
|-id=882 bgcolor=#E9E9E9
| 185882 ||  || — || August 24, 2000 || Socorro || LINEAR || EUN || align=right | 2.3 km || 
|-id=883 bgcolor=#E9E9E9
| 185883 ||  || — || August 24, 2000 || Socorro || LINEAR || — || align=right | 2.3 km || 
|-id=884 bgcolor=#E9E9E9
| 185884 ||  || — || August 24, 2000 || Socorro || LINEAR || — || align=right | 3.4 km || 
|-id=885 bgcolor=#E9E9E9
| 185885 ||  || — || August 28, 2000 || Socorro || LINEAR || — || align=right | 3.6 km || 
|-id=886 bgcolor=#E9E9E9
| 185886 ||  || — || August 31, 2000 || Socorro || LINEAR || — || align=right | 2.4 km || 
|-id=887 bgcolor=#E9E9E9
| 185887 ||  || — || August 31, 2000 || Socorro || LINEAR || — || align=right | 3.4 km || 
|-id=888 bgcolor=#E9E9E9
| 185888 ||  || — || August 31, 2000 || Socorro || LINEAR || — || align=right | 3.6 km || 
|-id=889 bgcolor=#E9E9E9
| 185889 ||  || — || August 26, 2000 || Socorro || LINEAR || EUN || align=right | 2.2 km || 
|-id=890 bgcolor=#E9E9E9
| 185890 ||  || — || August 31, 2000 || Socorro || LINEAR || — || align=right | 3.1 km || 
|-id=891 bgcolor=#E9E9E9
| 185891 ||  || — || August 26, 2000 || Haleakala || NEAT || — || align=right | 3.0 km || 
|-id=892 bgcolor=#E9E9E9
| 185892 ||  || — || August 31, 2000 || Socorro || LINEAR || — || align=right | 3.2 km || 
|-id=893 bgcolor=#E9E9E9
| 185893 ||  || — || August 30, 2000 || Kitt Peak || Spacewatch || AGN || align=right | 1.7 km || 
|-id=894 bgcolor=#E9E9E9
| 185894 ||  || — || August 30, 2000 || Kitt Peak || Spacewatch || — || align=right | 3.4 km || 
|-id=895 bgcolor=#E9E9E9
| 185895 ||  || — || September 1, 2000 || Socorro || LINEAR || — || align=right | 4.9 km || 
|-id=896 bgcolor=#E9E9E9
| 185896 ||  || — || September 1, 2000 || Socorro || LINEAR || GEF || align=right | 2.4 km || 
|-id=897 bgcolor=#d6d6d6
| 185897 ||  || — || September 1, 2000 || Socorro || LINEAR || BRA || align=right | 2.1 km || 
|-id=898 bgcolor=#E9E9E9
| 185898 ||  || — || September 3, 2000 || Socorro || LINEAR || — || align=right | 5.8 km || 
|-id=899 bgcolor=#E9E9E9
| 185899 ||  || — || September 1, 2000 || Socorro || LINEAR || EUN || align=right | 2.1 km || 
|-id=900 bgcolor=#E9E9E9
| 185900 ||  || — || September 19, 2000 || Prescott || P. G. Comba || — || align=right | 3.6 km || 
|}

185901–186000 

|-bgcolor=#d6d6d6
| 185901 ||  || — || September 24, 2000 || Prescott || P. G. Comba || — || align=right | 4.7 km || 
|-id=902 bgcolor=#E9E9E9
| 185902 ||  || — || September 24, 2000 || Socorro || LINEAR || GEF || align=right | 2.0 km || 
|-id=903 bgcolor=#E9E9E9
| 185903 ||  || — || September 24, 2000 || Socorro || LINEAR || — || align=right | 3.1 km || 
|-id=904 bgcolor=#d6d6d6
| 185904 ||  || — || September 24, 2000 || Socorro || LINEAR || — || align=right | 3.5 km || 
|-id=905 bgcolor=#E9E9E9
| 185905 ||  || — || September 22, 2000 || Socorro || LINEAR || — || align=right | 5.1 km || 
|-id=906 bgcolor=#C2FFFF
| 185906 ||  || — || September 23, 2000 || Socorro || LINEAR || L5 || align=right | 16 km || 
|-id=907 bgcolor=#E9E9E9
| 185907 ||  || — || September 23, 2000 || Socorro || LINEAR || — || align=right | 4.1 km || 
|-id=908 bgcolor=#E9E9E9
| 185908 ||  || — || September 24, 2000 || Socorro || LINEAR || MRX || align=right | 1.7 km || 
|-id=909 bgcolor=#E9E9E9
| 185909 ||  || — || September 26, 2000 || Socorro || LINEAR || — || align=right | 3.3 km || 
|-id=910 bgcolor=#E9E9E9
| 185910 ||  || — || September 19, 2000 || Haleakala || NEAT || — || align=right | 3.0 km || 
|-id=911 bgcolor=#E9E9E9
| 185911 ||  || — || September 20, 2000 || Kitt Peak || Spacewatch || — || align=right | 3.3 km || 
|-id=912 bgcolor=#E9E9E9
| 185912 ||  || — || September 20, 2000 || Haleakala || NEAT || — || align=right | 4.6 km || 
|-id=913 bgcolor=#E9E9E9
| 185913 ||  || — || September 24, 2000 || Socorro || LINEAR || — || align=right | 2.8 km || 
|-id=914 bgcolor=#d6d6d6
| 185914 ||  || — || September 24, 2000 || Socorro || LINEAR || KOR || align=right | 1.9 km || 
|-id=915 bgcolor=#E9E9E9
| 185915 ||  || — || September 25, 2000 || Socorro || LINEAR || ADE || align=right | 4.1 km || 
|-id=916 bgcolor=#E9E9E9
| 185916 ||  || — || September 25, 2000 || Socorro || LINEAR || NEM || align=right | 3.6 km || 
|-id=917 bgcolor=#d6d6d6
| 185917 ||  || — || September 26, 2000 || Socorro || LINEAR || — || align=right | 5.1 km || 
|-id=918 bgcolor=#d6d6d6
| 185918 ||  || — || September 30, 2000 || Socorro || LINEAR || — || align=right | 3.7 km || 
|-id=919 bgcolor=#C2FFFF
| 185919 ||  || — || September 23, 2000 || Socorro || LINEAR || L5 || align=right | 11 km || 
|-id=920 bgcolor=#d6d6d6
| 185920 ||  || — || September 27, 2000 || Socorro || LINEAR || — || align=right | 4.6 km || 
|-id=921 bgcolor=#d6d6d6
| 185921 ||  || — || September 28, 2000 || Socorro || LINEAR || — || align=right | 3.4 km || 
|-id=922 bgcolor=#E9E9E9
| 185922 ||  || — || September 28, 2000 || Kitt Peak || Spacewatch || — || align=right | 3.4 km || 
|-id=923 bgcolor=#E9E9E9
| 185923 ||  || — || September 29, 2000 || Kitt Peak || Spacewatch || — || align=right | 4.6 km || 
|-id=924 bgcolor=#E9E9E9
| 185924 ||  || — || September 20, 2000 || Socorro || LINEAR || — || align=right | 4.9 km || 
|-id=925 bgcolor=#d6d6d6
| 185925 ||  || — || October 1, 2000 || Socorro || LINEAR || — || align=right | 2.6 km || 
|-id=926 bgcolor=#d6d6d6
| 185926 ||  || — || October 1, 2000 || Anderson Mesa || LONEOS || — || align=right | 5.7 km || 
|-id=927 bgcolor=#E9E9E9
| 185927 ||  || — || October 1, 2000 || Socorro || LINEAR || MRX || align=right | 1.6 km || 
|-id=928 bgcolor=#d6d6d6
| 185928 ||  || — || October 1, 2000 || Socorro || LINEAR || — || align=right | 4.0 km || 
|-id=929 bgcolor=#E9E9E9
| 185929 ||  || — || October 2, 2000 || Anderson Mesa || LONEOS || — || align=right | 3.4 km || 
|-id=930 bgcolor=#d6d6d6
| 185930 ||  || — || October 2, 2000 || Socorro || LINEAR || EOS || align=right | 3.3 km || 
|-id=931 bgcolor=#E9E9E9
| 185931 ||  || — || October 24, 2000 || Socorro || LINEAR || — || align=right | 3.8 km || 
|-id=932 bgcolor=#E9E9E9
| 185932 ||  || — || October 24, 2000 || Socorro || LINEAR || TIN || align=right | 4.2 km || 
|-id=933 bgcolor=#d6d6d6
| 185933 ||  || — || October 25, 2000 || Socorro || LINEAR || — || align=right | 4.5 km || 
|-id=934 bgcolor=#E9E9E9
| 185934 ||  || — || October 29, 2000 || Socorro || LINEAR || — || align=right | 4.4 km || 
|-id=935 bgcolor=#E9E9E9
| 185935 ||  || — || October 30, 2000 || Socorro || LINEAR || INO || align=right | 2.1 km || 
|-id=936 bgcolor=#d6d6d6
| 185936 ||  || — || November 1, 2000 || Socorro || LINEAR || CHA || align=right | 3.6 km || 
|-id=937 bgcolor=#d6d6d6
| 185937 ||  || — || November 21, 2000 || Socorro || LINEAR || — || align=right | 3.2 km || 
|-id=938 bgcolor=#d6d6d6
| 185938 ||  || — || November 20, 2000 || Socorro || LINEAR || — || align=right | 6.4 km || 
|-id=939 bgcolor=#E9E9E9
| 185939 ||  || — || November 21, 2000 || Socorro || LINEAR || GEF || align=right | 2.3 km || 
|-id=940 bgcolor=#d6d6d6
| 185940 ||  || — || November 20, 2000 || Anderson Mesa || LONEOS || — || align=right | 5.3 km || 
|-id=941 bgcolor=#d6d6d6
| 185941 ||  || — || November 28, 2000 || Kitt Peak || Spacewatch || — || align=right | 4.0 km || 
|-id=942 bgcolor=#d6d6d6
| 185942 ||  || — || December 30, 2000 || Socorro || LINEAR || EOS || align=right | 3.6 km || 
|-id=943 bgcolor=#fefefe
| 185943 ||  || — || December 30, 2000 || Socorro || LINEAR || — || align=right | 1.2 km || 
|-id=944 bgcolor=#d6d6d6
| 185944 ||  || — || December 23, 2000 || Socorro || LINEAR || — || align=right | 4.7 km || 
|-id=945 bgcolor=#d6d6d6
| 185945 ||  || — || December 30, 2000 || Socorro || LINEAR || LIX || align=right | 6.6 km || 
|-id=946 bgcolor=#d6d6d6
| 185946 ||  || — || January 5, 2001 || Socorro || LINEAR || — || align=right | 5.1 km || 
|-id=947 bgcolor=#d6d6d6
| 185947 ||  || — || January 19, 2001 || Socorro || LINEAR || HYG || align=right | 4.1 km || 
|-id=948 bgcolor=#d6d6d6
| 185948 ||  || — || January 19, 2001 || Kitt Peak || Spacewatch || — || align=right | 4.5 km || 
|-id=949 bgcolor=#fefefe
| 185949 ||  || — || January 31, 2001 || Socorro || LINEAR || — || align=right | 1.4 km || 
|-id=950 bgcolor=#fefefe
| 185950 ||  || — || February 1, 2001 || Socorro || LINEAR || — || align=right | 1.2 km || 
|-id=951 bgcolor=#fefefe
| 185951 ||  || — || February 16, 2001 || Kitt Peak || Spacewatch || — || align=right | 1.3 km || 
|-id=952 bgcolor=#fefefe
| 185952 ||  || — || February 17, 2001 || Socorro || LINEAR || NYS || align=right | 4.3 km || 
|-id=953 bgcolor=#fefefe
| 185953 ||  || — || February 19, 2001 || Socorro || LINEAR || — || align=right | 1.4 km || 
|-id=954 bgcolor=#fefefe
| 185954 ||  || — || February 19, 2001 || Socorro || LINEAR || — || align=right | 1.2 km || 
|-id=955 bgcolor=#fefefe
| 185955 ||  || — || February 16, 2001 || Kitt Peak || Spacewatch || — || align=right data-sort-value="0.96" | 960 m || 
|-id=956 bgcolor=#fefefe
| 185956 ||  || — || February 19, 2001 || Socorro || LINEAR || FLO || align=right | 1.1 km || 
|-id=957 bgcolor=#fefefe
| 185957 ||  || — || February 19, 2001 || Socorro || LINEAR || — || align=right | 1.5 km || 
|-id=958 bgcolor=#fefefe
| 185958 ||  || — || March 14, 2001 || Kitt Peak || Spacewatch || — || align=right | 1.5 km || 
|-id=959 bgcolor=#fefefe
| 185959 ||  || — || March 19, 2001 || Kitt Peak || Spacewatch || — || align=right | 1.1 km || 
|-id=960 bgcolor=#fefefe
| 185960 ||  || — || March 19, 2001 || Socorro || LINEAR || NYS || align=right | 1.0 km || 
|-id=961 bgcolor=#fefefe
| 185961 ||  || — || March 19, 2001 || Socorro || LINEAR || — || align=right | 1.2 km || 
|-id=962 bgcolor=#fefefe
| 185962 ||  || — || March 19, 2001 || Socorro || LINEAR || fast? || align=right | 1.6 km || 
|-id=963 bgcolor=#fefefe
| 185963 ||  || — || March 17, 2001 || Kitt Peak || Spacewatch || FLO || align=right | 1.2 km || 
|-id=964 bgcolor=#fefefe
| 185964 ||  || — || March 24, 2001 || Kitt Peak || Spacewatch || — || align=right data-sort-value="0.97" | 970 m || 
|-id=965 bgcolor=#fefefe
| 185965 ||  || — || March 23, 2001 || Anderson Mesa || LONEOS || — || align=right | 1.2 km || 
|-id=966 bgcolor=#fefefe
| 185966 ||  || — || April 18, 2001 || Socorro || LINEAR || NYS || align=right data-sort-value="0.93" | 930 m || 
|-id=967 bgcolor=#fefefe
| 185967 ||  || — || April 22, 2001 || Socorro || LINEAR || PHO || align=right | 1.9 km || 
|-id=968 bgcolor=#fefefe
| 185968 ||  || — || April 23, 2001 || Socorro || LINEAR || — || align=right | 1.0 km || 
|-id=969 bgcolor=#fefefe
| 185969 ||  || — || April 26, 2001 || Anderson Mesa || LONEOS || PHO || align=right | 1.6 km || 
|-id=970 bgcolor=#fefefe
| 185970 ||  || — || April 24, 2001 || Haleakala || NEAT || — || align=right | 1.3 km || 
|-id=971 bgcolor=#fefefe
| 185971 ||  || — || May 15, 2001 || Anderson Mesa || LONEOS || FLO || align=right data-sort-value="0.98" | 980 m || 
|-id=972 bgcolor=#fefefe
| 185972 ||  || — || May 18, 2001 || Socorro || LINEAR || — || align=right | 1.4 km || 
|-id=973 bgcolor=#fefefe
| 185973 ||  || — || May 22, 2001 || Socorro || LINEAR || PHO || align=right | 1.6 km || 
|-id=974 bgcolor=#fefefe
| 185974 ||  || — || May 17, 2001 || Socorro || LINEAR || FLO || align=right | 1.3 km || 
|-id=975 bgcolor=#fefefe
| 185975 ||  || — || May 22, 2001 || Socorro || LINEAR || — || align=right | 1.4 km || 
|-id=976 bgcolor=#fefefe
| 185976 ||  || — || May 24, 2001 || Ondřejov || P. Kušnirák, P. Pravec || V || align=right data-sort-value="0.88" | 880 m || 
|-id=977 bgcolor=#fefefe
| 185977 ||  || — || June 23, 2001 || Eskridge || Farpoint Obs. || NYS || align=right | 1.2 km || 
|-id=978 bgcolor=#FA8072
| 185978 ||  || — || June 21, 2001 || Palomar || NEAT || — || align=right | 1.8 km || 
|-id=979 bgcolor=#fefefe
| 185979 ||  || — || June 27, 2001 || Palomar || NEAT || FLO || align=right | 1.2 km || 
|-id=980 bgcolor=#fefefe
| 185980 ||  || — || June 16, 2001 || Palomar || NEAT || — || align=right | 2.0 km || 
|-id=981 bgcolor=#fefefe
| 185981 ||  || — || June 30, 2001 || Palomar || NEAT || — || align=right | 1.5 km || 
|-id=982 bgcolor=#fefefe
| 185982 || 2001 NW || — || July 12, 2001 || Palomar || NEAT || — || align=right | 2.8 km || 
|-id=983 bgcolor=#fefefe
| 185983 ||  || — || July 10, 2001 || Palomar || NEAT || — || align=right | 3.5 km || 
|-id=984 bgcolor=#fefefe
| 185984 ||  || — || July 13, 2001 || Palomar || NEAT || MAS || align=right | 1.2 km || 
|-id=985 bgcolor=#fefefe
| 185985 ||  || — || July 14, 2001 || Palomar || NEAT || — || align=right | 2.7 km || 
|-id=986 bgcolor=#fefefe
| 185986 ||  || — || July 14, 2001 || Haleakala || NEAT || MAS || align=right data-sort-value="0.96" | 960 m || 
|-id=987 bgcolor=#fefefe
| 185987 ||  || — || July 17, 2001 || Haleakala || NEAT || — || align=right | 1.1 km || 
|-id=988 bgcolor=#fefefe
| 185988 ||  || — || July 19, 2001 || Palomar || NEAT || — || align=right | 1.6 km || 
|-id=989 bgcolor=#E9E9E9
| 185989 ||  || — || July 19, 2001 || Palomar || NEAT || — || align=right | 3.6 km || 
|-id=990 bgcolor=#fefefe
| 185990 ||  || — || July 21, 2001 || San Marcello || A. Boattini, L. Tesi || — || align=right | 1.6 km || 
|-id=991 bgcolor=#fefefe
| 185991 ||  || — || July 19, 2001 || Palomar || NEAT || — || align=right | 1.2 km || 
|-id=992 bgcolor=#E9E9E9
| 185992 ||  || — || July 23, 2001 || Palomar || NEAT || — || align=right | 2.2 km || 
|-id=993 bgcolor=#fefefe
| 185993 ||  || — || July 28, 2001 || Haleakala || NEAT || — || align=right | 3.4 km || 
|-id=994 bgcolor=#E9E9E9
| 185994 ||  || — || July 25, 2001 || Haleakala || NEAT || — || align=right | 1.5 km || 
|-id=995 bgcolor=#fefefe
| 185995 ||  || — || August 8, 2001 || Palomar || NEAT || NYS || align=right | 1.1 km || 
|-id=996 bgcolor=#fefefe
| 185996 ||  || — || August 10, 2001 || Palomar || NEAT || PHO || align=right | 1.6 km || 
|-id=997 bgcolor=#E9E9E9
| 185997 ||  || — || August 10, 2001 || Palomar || NEAT || EUN || align=right | 1.9 km || 
|-id=998 bgcolor=#E9E9E9
| 185998 ||  || — || August 12, 2001 || Palomar || NEAT || MAR || align=right | 1.6 km || 
|-id=999 bgcolor=#fefefe
| 185999 ||  || — || August 13, 2001 || Haleakala || NEAT || — || align=right | 1.2 km || 
|-id=000 bgcolor=#fefefe
| 186000 ||  || — || August 16, 2001 || Socorro || LINEAR || NYS || align=right data-sort-value="0.93" | 930 m || 
|}

References

External links 
 Discovery Circumstances: Numbered Minor Planets (185001)–(190000) (IAU Minor Planet Center)

0185